This is an incomplete list of Statutory Instruments of the United Kingdom in 1998.

1-100

 The Road Vehicles (Construction and Use) (Amendment) Regulations 1998 (S.I. 1998 No. 1)
 The National Health Service (Proposals for Pilot Schemes) and (Miscellaneous Amendments) Amendment Regulations 1998 (S.I. 1998 No. 3)
 The National Health Service (General Medical Services) (Scotland) Amendment Regulations 1998 (S.I. 1998 No.4 (S.1)])
 The National Health Service (Vocational Training for General Medical Practice) (Scotland) Regulations 1998 (S.I. 1998 No. 5 (S.2)])
 The River Tweed (Baits and Lures) Regulations 1998 (S.I. 1998 No. 6 (S.3)])
 The A205 Trunk Road (Greenwich) Red Route (Banned Turns) Traffic Order 1998 (S.I. 1998 No. 8)
 The Beef Carcase (Classification) (Amendment) Regulations 1998 (S.I. 1998 No. 12)
 The A501 Trunk Road (Euston Road, Camden) Red Route (Prescribed Routes) Traffic Order 1998 (S.I. 1998 No. 15)
 The Chester to Holyhead Trunk Road (A55) (Bryngwran to Holyhead) Order 1998 (S.I. 1998 No. 16)
 The Social Fund Winter Fuel Payment Regulations 1998 (S.I. 1998 No. 19)
 The Motor Vehicles (Driving Licences) (Amendment) Regulations 1998 (S.I. 1998 No. 20)
 The Lands Tribunal (Amendment) Rules 1998 (S.I. 1998 No. 22)
 The Prison (Amendment) Rules 1998 (S.I. 1998 No. 23)
 The A1400 Trunk Road (Redbridge) Red Route (Prohibited Turn) Traffic Order 1998 (S.I. 1998 No. 24)
 The A23 Trunk Road (Croydon) Red Route (Prohibited Turns) Traffic Order 1998 (S.I. 1998 No. 25)
 The A12 Trunk Road (Redbridge) (No. 1) Red Route Traffic Order 1996 Variation Order 1998 (S.I. 1998 No. 26)
 The Financial Markets and Insolvency (Ecu Contracts) Regulations 1998 (S.I. 1998 No. 27)
 The A12 Trunk Road (Redbridge) Red Route Traffic Order 1996 Variation (No. 2) Order 1998 (S.I. 1998 No. 29)
 The A1400 Trunk Road (Redbridge) Red Route Traffic Order 1996 Variation Order 1998 (S.I. 1998 No. 30)
 The Employment Protection Code of Practice (Disciplinary Practice and Procedures) Order 1998 (S.I. 1998 No. 44)
 The Employment Protection Code of Practice (Disclosure of Information) Order 1998 (S.I. 1998 No. 45)
 The Employment Protection Code of Practice (Time Off) Order 1998 (S.I. 1998 No. 46)
 The Council Tax and Non-Domestic Rating (Demand Notices) (England) (Amendment) (Rural Rate Relief) Regulations 1998 (S.I. 1998 No. 47)
 The Local Government Changes (Rent Act Registration Areas) Order 1998 (S.I. 1998 No. 54)
 The Immigration (Transit Visa) (Amendment) Order 1998 (S.I. 1998 No. 55)
 The A1 Trunk Road (Haringey) Red Route Traffic Order 1993 Variation (No. 2) Order 1998 (S.I. 1998 No. 56)
 The A10 Trunk Road (Haringey) Red Route Traffic Order 1997 Variation Order 1998 (S.I. 1998 No. 57)
 The Child Support (Miscellaneous Amendments) Regulations 1998 (S.I. 1998 No. 58)
 The Value Added Tax (Amendment) Regulations 1998 (S.I. 1998 No. 59)
 The Insurance Premium Tax (Amendment) Regulations 1998 (S.I. 1998 No. 60)
 The Landfill Tax (Amendment) Regulations 1998 (S.I. 1998 No. 61)
 The Revenue Traders (Accounts and Records) (Amendment) Regulations 1998 (S.I. 1998 No. 62)
 The Aircraft Operators (Accounts and Records) (Amendment) Regulations 1998 (S.I. 1998 No. 63)
 The Jobseeker's Allowance (Amendment) Regulations 1998 (S.I. 1998 No. 71)
 The Food Protection (Emergency Prohibitions) (Radioactivity in Sheep) (Wales) (Partial Revocation) Order 1998 (S.I. 1998 No. 72)
 The General Optical Council (Registration and Enrolment (Amendment) Rules) Order of Council 1998 (S.I. 1998 No. 73)
 The A41 Trunk Road (Westminster) Red Route Traffic Order 1998 (S.I. 1998 No. 76)
 The A1 Trunk Road (Islington) Red Route Traffic Order 1993 Experimental Variation Order 1998 (S.I. 1998 No. 77)
 The A501 Trunk Road (Camden and Westminster) Red Route Traffic Order 1998 (S.I. 1998 No. 78)
 The Nitrate Sensitive Areas (Amendment) Regulations 1998 (S.I. 1998 No. 79)
 The Education (Grants for Education Support and Training) (England) (Amendment) Regulations 1998 (S.I. 1998 No. 80)
 The Electrical Equipment for Explosive Atmospheres (Certification) (Amendment) Regulations 1998 (S.I. 1998 No. 81)
 The Food Protection (Emergency Prohibitions) (Radioactivity in Sheep) Partial Revocation Order 1998 (S.I. 1998 No. 82 (S.4)])
 The London Docklands Development Corporation (Transfer of Property, Rights and Liabilities) Order 1998 (S.I. 1998 No. 83)
 The Urban Development Corporations in England (Planning Functions) Order 1998 (S.I. 1998 No. 84)
 The Urban Development Corporations in England (Transfer of Property, Rights and Liabilities) (Commission for the New Towns) Order 1998 (S.I. 1998 No. 85)
 The Education (Direct Grant Schools) (Revocation) Regulations 1998 (S.I. 1998 No. 86)
 The Rating Lists (Valuation Date) Order 1998 (S.I. 1998 No. 93)

101-200

 The Feeding Stuffs (Amendment) Regulations 1998 (S.I. 1998 No. 104)
 The Council Tax (Prescribed Classes of Dwellings) (Wales) Regulations 1998 (S.I. 1998 No. 105)
 The Approval of Codes of Management Practice(Residential Property) Order 1998 (S.I. 1998 No. 106)
 The Medicines (Pharmacy and General Sale—Exemption) Amendment Order 1998 (S.I. 1998 No. 107)
 The Prescription Only Medicines (Human Use) Amendment Order 1998 (S.I. 1998 No. 108)
 The National Crime Squad (Secretary of State's Objectives) Order 1998 (S.I. 1998 No. 109)
 The NCIS (Secretary of State's Objectives) Order 1998 (S.I. 1998 No. 110)
 The Temporary Traffic Signs (Prescribed Bodies) (England and Wales) Regulations 1998 (S.I. 1998 No. 111)
 The Haverfordwest to Milford Haven Trunk Road (A4076) (Victoria Bridge, Milford Haven Improvement) Order 1998 (S.I. 1998 No. 112)
 The Deregulation (Licence Transfers) Order 1998 (S.I. 1998 No. 114)
 The Licensing (Fees) (Amendment) Order 1998 (S.I. 1998 No. 115)
 The Recreational Craft (Amendment) Regulations 1998 (S.I. 1998 No. 116)
 The London Borough of Lambeth (Trunk Roads) Red Route (Bus Lanes) Traffic Order 1998 (S.I. 1998 No. 118)
 The Local Government Finance (New Parishes) Regulations 1998 (S.I. 1998 No. 119)
 The Local Government Act 1988 (Defined Activities) (Exemption) (Harlow District Council) Order 1998 (S.I. 1998 No. 120)
 The Birmingham Northern Relief Road and Connecting Roads Scheme 1998 (S.I. 1998 No. 121)
 The A5 Trunk Road (Churchbridge Improvement) Order 1998 (S.I. 1998 No. 122)
 The M42 Motorway (Dunton Diversion) Scheme 1998 (S.I. 1998 No. 123)
 The Birmingham Northern Relief Road Toll Order 1998 (S.I. 1998 No. 124)
 The M6 Motorway (Saredon and Packington Diversions) Scheme 1998 (S.I. 1998 No. 125)
 The A5 Trunk Road (Churchbridge Improvement) (Detrunking) Order 1998 (S.I. 1998 No. 126)
 The A5 Trunk Road (Wall Island Improvement) Order 1998 (S.I. 1998 No. 127)
 The A34 Trunk Road (Churchbridge) Order 1998 (S.I. 1998 No. 128)
 The A5148 Trunk Road (Wall Island Improvement) Order 1998 (S.I. 1998 No. 129)
 The A34 Trunk Road (Churchbridge) (Detrunking) Order 1998 (S.I. 1998 No. 130)
 The A5195 Trunk Road (Birmingham Northern Relief Road Link Road) Order 1998 (S.I. 1998 No. 131)
 The Housing Accommodation and Homelessness (Persons subject to Immigration Control) (Amendment) Order 1998 (S.I. 1998 No. 139)
 The Land Registration (District Registries) Order 1998 (S.I. 1998 No. 140)
 The Bread and Flour Regulations 1998 (S.I. 1998 No. 141)
 The Non-Domestic Rating (Demand Notices) (Wales) (Amendment) (Rural Rate Relief) Regulations 1998 (S.I. 1998 No. 155)
 The Hyde-Clarendon College (Dissolution) Order 1998 (S.I. 1998 No. 156)
 The Prevention of Water Pollution (Loch Turret) (Extension of Period of Byelaws) Order 1998 (S.I. 1998 No. 157 (S.5)])
 The Housing Revenue Account General Fund Contribution Limits (Scotland) Order 1998 (S.I. 1998 No. 158 (S. 6)])
 The Non-Domestic Rate (Scotland) Order 1998 (S.I. 1998 No. 159 (S.7)])
 The Knives (Forfeited Property) Regulations (Northern Ireland) 1998 (S.I. 1998 No. 161)
 The Education (Mandatory Awards) (Amendment) Regulations 1998 (S.I. 1998 No. 162)
 The Public Telecommunication System Designation (KDD Europe Limited) Order 1998 (S.I. 1998 No. 163)
 The Public Telecommunication System Designation (The Phone Company) Order 1998 (S.I. 1998 No. 164)
 The Public Telecommunication System Designation (HighwayOne Corporation Limited) Order 1998 (S.I. 1998 No. 165)
 The Public Telecommunication System Designation (Frontel Communications Limited) Order 1998 (S.I. 1998 No. 166)
 The Public Telecommunication System Designation (IDT Global Limited) Order 1998 (S.I. 1998 No. 167)
 The Public Telecommunication System Designation (Teleport (Northern Ireland) Limited) Order 1998 (S.I. 1998 No. 168)
 The Public Telecommunication System Designation (AXS Telecom (UK) Limited) Order 1998 (S.I. 1998 No. 169)
 The Public Telecommunication System Designation (Izenkom Limited) Order 1998 (S.I. 1998 No. 170)
 The Public Telecommunication System Designation (Skylight Holdings Incorporated) Order 1998 (S.I. 1998 No. 171)
 The Public Telecommunication System Designation (Eurobell (Holdings) Plc) Order 1998 (S.I. 1998 No. 172)
 The Public Telecommunication System Designation (GT UK Limited) Order 1998 (S.I. 1998 No. 173)
 The Public Telecommunication System Designation (Internet Network Services Limited) Order 1998 (S.I. 1998 No. 174)
 The Doncaster Royal Infirmary and Montagu Hospital National Health Service Trust (Transfer of Trust Property) Order 1998 (S.I. 1998 No. 175)
 The Isle of Wight Healthcare National Health Service Trust (Transfer of Trust Property) Order 1998 (S.I. 1998 No. 176)
 The Lincoln District Healthcare National Health Service Trust (Transfer of Trust Property) Order 1998 (S.I. 1998 No. 177)
 The North and East Devon Health Authority (Transfers of Trust Property) Order 1998 (S.I. 1998 No. 178)
 The A205 Trunk Road (Southwark) Red Route (Prohibited Turns) Experimental Traffic Order 1998 (S.I. 1998 No. 179)
 The A23 Trunk Road (Lambeth) Red Route (Prohibition of Traffic) Order 1998 (S.I. 1998 No. 180)
 The Broadcasting Act 1996 (Commencement No. 3) Order 1998 (S.I. 1998 No. 188 (C. 1)])
 The Broadcasting (Percentage of National Radio Multiplex Revenue) Order 1998 (S.I. 1998 No. 189)
 The Animals and Animal Products (Import And Export) Regulations 1998 (S.I. 1998 No. 190)
 The Pre-Sentence Report Disclosure (Prescription of Prosecutors) Order 1998 (S.I. 1998 No. 191)
 The Local Government (Discretionary Payments and Injury Benefits) (Scotland) Regulations 1998 (S.I. 1998 No. 192 (S. 8)])
 The Frenchay Healthcare National Health Service Trust (Establishment) Amendment Order 1998 (S.I. 1998 No. 193)

201-300

 The Potatoes Originating in Egypt Regulations 1998 (S.I. 1998 No. 201)
 The Excise Duty Point (External and Internal Community Transit Procedure) Regulations 1998 (S.I. 1998 No. 202)
 The Copyright (Certification of Licensing Scheme for Educational Recording of Broadcasts and Cable Programmes) (Educational Recording Agency Limited) (Amendment) Order 1998 (S.I. 1998 No. 203)
 The A3 Trunk Road (Kingston and Wandsworth) (Temporary 30 mph Speed Restriction) Order 1998 (S.I. 1998 No. 204)
 The Civil Aviation (Canadian Navigation Services) (Second Amendment) Regulations 1998 (S.I. 1998 No. 205)
 The Hill Livestock (Compensatory Allowances) (Amendment) Regulations 1998 (S.I. 1998 No. 206)
 The Sole, etc. (Specified Sea Areas) (Prohibition of Fishing) (Variation) Order 1998 (S.I. 1998 No. 207)
 The Education (Funding for Teacher Training) Designation Order 1998 (S.I. 1998 No. 208)
 The Merchant Shipping (Compulsory Insurance: Ships Receiving Trans-shipped Fish) Regulations 1998 (S.I. 1998 No. 209)
 The Education (Student Loans) Act 1998 (Commencement) Order 1998 (S.I. 1998 No. 210 (C.2)])
 The Education (Student Loans) Regulations 1998 (S.I. 1998 No. 211)
 The Building Societies (Transfer of Business) Regulations 1998 (S.I. 1998 No. 212)
 The Local Authorities (Alteration of Requisite Calculations) Regulations 1998 (S.I. 1998 No. 213)
 The Local Government Changes for England (Council Tax) (Transitional Reduction) Regulations 1998 (S.I. 1998 No. 214)
 The Contracting Out (Functions in relation to the Management of Crown Lands) Order 1998 (S.I. 1998 No. 215)
 The Police (Secretary of State's Objectives) Order 1998 (S.I. 1998 No. 216)
 The New Deal (Miscellaneous Provisions) Order 1998 (S.I. 1998 No. 217)
 The Education (Modification of Enactments Relating to Employment) Order 1998 (S.I. 1998 No. 218)
 The Surface Waters (Dangerous Substances) (Classification) (Scotland) Regulations 1998 (S.I. 1998 No. 250 (S.9)])
 The National Health Service (Charges to Overseas Visitors) (Scotland) Amendment Regulations 1998 (S.I. 1998 No. 251 (S.10)])
 The Scottish Legal Services Ombudsman and Commissioner for Local Administration in Scotland Act 1997 (Commencement) Order 1998 (S.I. 1998 No. 252 (C. 3) (S.11)])
 Visiting Forces and International Headquarters (Application of Law) (Amendment) Order 1998 (S.I. 1998 No. 253)
 The Merchant Shipping (Prevention of Pollution) (Amendment) Order 1998 (S.I. 1998 No. 254)
 The Brunei (Appeals) (Amendment) Order 1998 (S.I. 1998 No. 255)
 The Child Abduction and Custody (Parties to Conventions) (Amendment) Order 1998 (S.I. 1998 No. 256)
 The Consular Fees Order 1998 (S.I. 1998 No. 257)
 The Education (Student Loans) (Northern Ireland) Order 1998 (S.I. 1998 No. 258 (N.I. 1)])
 The European Convention on Extradition Order 1990 (Amendment) Order 1998 (S.I. 1998 No. 259)
 The Merchant Shipping (Oil Pollution and General Provisions) (Guernsey) Order 1998 (S.I. 1998 No. 260)
 Museums and Galleries (Northern Ireland) Order 1997 (S.I. 1998 No. 261 (N.I. 2)])
 The Naval, Military and Air Forces Etc. (Disablement and Death) Service Pensions Amendment Order 1998 (S.I. 1998 No. 262)
 The Social Security (Contributions and Industrial Injuries) (Canada) Order 1998 (S.I. 1998 No. 263)
 The Trial of the Pyx (Amendment) Order 1998 (S.I. 1998 No. 264)
 The Housing (Change of Landlord) (Payment of Disposal Cost by Instalments) (Amendment) Regulations 1998 (S.I. 1998 No. 265)
 The Council Tax Reduction Scheme (Wales) Regulations 1998 (S.I. 1998 No. 266)
 The Council Tax (Demand Notices) (Wales) (Transitional Provisions) Regulations 1998 (S.I. 1998 No. 267)
 The Sea Fishing (Enforcement of Community Quota Measures) Order 1998 (S.I. 1998 No. 268)
 The Third Country Fishing (Enforcement) Order 1998 (S.I. 1998 No. 269)
 The Veterinary Surgeons and Veterinary Practitioners (Registration) (Amendment) Regulations Order of Council 1998 (S.I. 1998 No. 270)
 The Veterinary Surgeons (Examination of Commonwealth and Foreign Candidates) (Amendment) Regulations Order of Council 1998 (S.I. 1998 No. 271)
 The Dual-Use and Related Goods (Export Control) (Amendment) Regulations 1998 (S.I. 1998 No. 272)
 The Road Traffic (Special Parking Area) (Royal Borough of Kingston upon Thames) (Amendment) Order 1998 (S.I. 1998 No. 273)
 The Transport and Works Act 1992 (Commencement No. 7) Order 1998 (S.I. 1998 No. 274 (C. 4)])
 The A406 Trunk Road (Hanger Lane and Ashbourne Road, Ealing) (Prohibition of Right-turn) Order 1998 (S.I. 1998 No. 275)
 The Children (Protection at Work) Regulations 1998 (S.I. 1998 No. 276)
 The Criminal Justice and Public Order Act 1994 (Commencement No. 12 and Transitional Provision) Order 1998 (S.I. 1998 No. 277 (C. 5)])
 The Personal Injuries (Civilians) Amendment Scheme 1998 (S.I. 1998 No. 278)
 The Chester Waterworks Company (Constitution and Regulation) Order 1998 (S.I. 1998 No. 281)
 The Council Tax (Exempt Dwellings and Discount Disregards) (Amendment) Order 1998 (S.I. 1998 No. 291)
 The National Heritage Act 1997 (Commencement) Order 1998 (S.I. 1998 No. 292 (C.6)])
 The London Docklands Development Corporation (Alteration of Designated Areas) Order 1998 (S.I. 1998 No. 293)
 The Council Tax (Discount Disregards) (Amendment) Regulations 1998 (S.I. 1998 No. 294)
 The Council Tax (Administration and Enforcement) (Amendment) Regulations 1998 (S.I. 1998 No. 295)

301-400

 The Local Authorities (Goods and Services) (Public Bodies) Order 1998 (S.I. 1998 No. 308)
 The Taxes (Interest Rate) (Amendment) Regulations 1998 (S.I. 1998 No. 310)
 The Finance Act 1989, section 178(1), (Appointed Day) Order 1998 (S.I. 1998 No. 311 (C. 7)])
 The Northern Ireland (Emergency Provisions) Act 1996 (Code of Practice) Order 1998 (S.I. 1998 No. 312)
 The Northern Ireland (Emergency Provisions) Act 1996 (Silent Video Recording of Interviews) Order 1998 (S.I. 1998 No. 313)
 The Food Protection (Emergency Prohibitions) (Oil and Chemical Pollution of Fish) Order 1997 (Revocation) Order 1998 (S.I. 1998 No. 314 (S.12)])
 The Church Representation Rules (Amendment) Resolution 1998 (S.I. 1998 No. 319)
 The Housing (Right to Buy) (Priority of Charges) Order 1998 (S.I. 1998 No. 320)
 The Chichester Priority Care Services National Health Service Trust (Establishment) Amendment Order 1998 (S.I. 1998 No. 321)
 The Leeds Community and Mental Health Services Teaching National Health Service Trust (Establishment) Amendment Order 1998 (S.I. 1998 No. 322)
 The Northallerton Health Services National Health Service Trust (Establishment) Amendment Order 1998 (S.I. 1998 No. 323)
 The Local Government Act 1988 (Defined Activities) (Exemption) (Harlow District Council and North Hertfordshire District Council) Order 1998 (S.I. 1998 No. 325)
 The Local Government Act 1988 (Defined Activities) (Exemption) (Luton Borough Council) Order 1998 (S.I. 1998 No. 326)
 The Cardiff to Glan Conwy Trunk Road (A470) (Ty Nant to North of Maentwrog Road Station Improvement) Order 1998 (S.I. 1998 No. 329)
 The Council Tax (Discounts) (Scotland) Amendment Regulations 1998 (S.I. 1998 No. 340 (S.15)])
 The Council Tax (Discounts) (Scotland) Amendment Order 1998 (S.I. 1998 No. 341 (S.16)])
 The Plant Health (Great Britain) (Amendment) Order 1998 (S.I. 1998 No. 349)
 The Police Act 1997 (Commencement No. 5 and Transitional Provisions) Order 1998 (S.I. 1998 No. 354 (C.8)])
 The Devon (Coroners) Order 1998 (S.I. 1998 No. 355)
 The Cheshire (Coroners) Order 1998 (S.I. 1998 No. 356)
 The Essex (Coroners) Order 1998 (S.I. 1998 No. 357)
 The Kent (Coroners) Order 1998 (S.I. 1998 No. 358)
 The Hereford and Worcester (Coroners) Order 1998 (S.I. 1998 No. 359)
 The Lancashire (Coroners) Order 1998 (S.I. 1998 No. 360)
 The Nottinghamshire (Coroners) Order 1998 (S.I. 1998 No. 361)
 The Peterborough (Coroners) Order 1998 (S.I. 1998 No. 362)
 The Shropshire (Coroners) Order 1998 (S.I. 1998 No. 363)
 The Local Government Pension Scheme (Transitional Provisions) (Scotland) Regulations 1998 (S.I. 1998 No. 364 (S. 13)])
 The Local Government Pension Scheme (Scotland) Regulations 1998 (S.I. 1998 No. 366 (S.14)])
 The A40 Trunk Road (Western Avenue, Ealing) (Speed Limits) Order 1998 (S.I. 1998 No. 367)
 The Local Authorities (Capital Finance) (Amendment) Regulations 1998 (S.I. 1998 No. 371)
 The A41 Trunk Road (Camden) Red Route (Bus Lanes) Traffic Order 1998 (S.I. 1998 No. 381)
 The A205 Trunk Road (Greenwich) Red Route Traffic Order 1998 (S.I. 1998 No. 382)
 The A41 Trunk Road (Camden) (Temporary Prohibition of Traffic) Order 1998 (S.I. 1998 No. 383)
 The A4 Trunk Road (Colnbrook By-Pass, Tarmac Way And Stanwell Moor Road, Hillingdon) (Prohibition Of U-Turn) Order 1998 (S.I. 1998 No. 384)
 The A4 Trunk Road (Colnbrook By-Pass, Hillingdon) (50 mph Speed Limit) Order 1998 (S.I. 1998 No. 385)
 The Education Act 1997 (Commencement No. 3 and Transitional Provisions) Order 1998 (S.I. 1998 No. 386 (C.9)])
 The A4 Trunk Road (Bath Road and Hatch Lane, Hillingdon) (Prohibition of U-Turn) Order 1998 (S.I. 1998 No. 387)
 The A4 Trunk Road (Bath Road and Newport Road, Hillingdon) (Prohibition of U-turn) Order 1998 (S.I. 1998 No. 388)
 The Surface Waters (Dangerous Substances) (Classification) Regulations 1998 (S.I. 1998 No. 389)
 The Non-Domestic Rating (Rural Settlements) (Wales) (Amendment) Order 1998 (S.I. 1998 No. 390)
 The Education (Grant-maintained and Grant-maintained Special Schools) (Finance) (Wales) (Amendment) Regulations 1998 (S.I. 1998 No. 391)
 The Education (Grants for Education Support and Training) (Wales) Regulations 1998 (S.I. 1998 No. 392)
 The Non-Domestic Rating (Rural Settlements) (England) Order 1998 (S.I. 1998 No. 393)
 The A205 Trunk Road (Lambeth) Red Route Experimental Traffic Order 1998 (S.I. 1998 No. 394)
 The Public Order (Prescribed Forms) Regulations (Northern Ireland) 1998 (S.I. 1998 No. 395)

401-500

 The Guaranteed Minimum Pensions Increase Order 1998 (S.I. 1998 No. 406)
 The Social Security (Incapacity for Work) (General) Amendment Regulations 1998 (S.I. 1998 No. 407)
 The Police Information Technology Organisation (Additional Bodies) Order 1998 (S.I. 1998 No. 411)
 The Education (Special Educational Needs) (Approval of Independent Schools) (Amendment) Regulations 1998 (S.I. 1998 No. 417)
 The Essex County Council (Boroughs of Southend-on-Sea and Thurrock) (Staff Transfer) Order 1998 (S.I. 1998 No. 442)
 The Cambridgeshire County Council (City of Peterborough) (Staff Transfer) Order 1998 (S.I. 1998 No. 443)
 The Hereford and Worcester (Staff Transfer) Order 1998 (S.I. 1998 No. 444)
 The Lancashire County Council (Boroughs of Blackburn with Darwen and Blackpool) (Staff Transfer) Order 1998 (S.I. 1998 No. 445)
 The Cheshire County Council (Boroughs of Halton and Warrington) (Staff Transfer) Order 1998 (S.I. 1998 No. 446)
 The Nottinghamshire County Council (City of Nottingham) (Staff Transfer) Order 1998 (S.I. 1998 No. 447)
 The Shropshire County Council (District of The Wrekin) (Staff Transfer) Order 1998 (S.I. 1998 No. 448)
 The Kent County Council (Borough of Gillingham and City of Rochester upon Medway) (Staff Transfer) Order 1998 (S.I. 1998 No. 449)
 The Berkshire County Council (Staff Transfer) Order 1998 (S.I. 1998 No. 450)
 The Devon County Council (City of Plymouth and Borough of Torbay) (Staff Transfer) Order 1998 (S.I. 1998 No. 451)
 The Spreadable Fats (Marketing Standards) (Amendment) Regulations 1998 (S.I. 1998 No. 452)
 The Common Agricultural Policy (Wine) (Amendment) Regulations 1998 (S.I. 1998 No. 453)
 The Gaming (Bingo) Act (Fees) (Amendment) Order 1998 (S.I. 1998 No. 454)
 The Lotteries (Gaming Board Fees) Order 1998 (S.I. 1998 No. 455)
 The Gaming Act (Variation of Fees) Order 1998 (S.I. 1998 No. 456)
 The London Docklands Development Corporation (Transfer of Property, Rights and Liabilities) (Lee Valley Regional Park Authority) Order 1998 (S.I. 1998 No. 458)
 The Department of Transport (Fees) (Amendment) Order 1998 (S.I. 1998 No. 459)
 The Wireless Telegraphy (Licence Charges) (Amendment) Regulations 1998 (S.I. 1998 No. 460)
 The Criminal Justice Act 1991 (Notice of Transfer) (Amendment) Regulations 1998 (S.I. 1998 No. 461)
 The Town and Country Planning (General Permitted Development) (Amendment) Order 1998 (S.I. 1998 No. 462)
 The Specified Animal Pathogens Order 1998 (S.I. 1998 No. 463)
 The Local Government Reorganisation (Amendment of Coroners Act 1988) Regulations 1998 (S.I. 1998 No. 465)
 The Berkshire (Coroners) Order 1998 (S.I. 1998 No. 466)
 The Highway Litter Clearance and Cleaning (Transfer of Responsibility) Order 1998 (S.I. 1998 No. 467)
 The Sugar Beet (Research and Education) Order 1998 (S.I. 1998 No. 468)
 The Social Security (Contributions) (Re-rating and National Insurance Fund Payments) Order 1998 (S.I. 1998 No. 469)
 The Social Security Benefits Up-rating Order 1998 (S.I. 1998 No. 470)
 The Special Trustees for Westminster and Roehampton Hospitals (Transfer of Trust Property) Order 1998 (S.I. 1998 No. 471)
 The Secure Training Centre Rules 1998 (S.I. 1998 No. 472)
 The Secure Training Centres (Escorts) Rules 1998 (S.I. 1998 No. 473)
 The Criminal Justice and Public Order Act 1994 (Suspension of Custody Officer Certificate) Regulations 1998 (S.I. 1998 No. 474)
 The National Health Service (Dental Charges) Amendment Regulations 1998 (S.I. 1998 No. 490)
 The National Health Service (Charges for Drugs and Appliances) Amendment Regulations 1998 (S.I. 1998 No. 491)
 The National Health Service Trusts (Originating Capital Debt) Order 1998 (S.I. 1998 No. 492)
 The Police (Amendment) Regulations 1998 (S.I. 1998 No. 493)
 The Health and Safety (Enforcing Authority) Regulations 1998 (S.I. 1998 No. 494)
 The Merchant Shipping (Light Dues) (Amendment) Regulations 1998 (S.I. 1998 No. 495)
 The Area Tourist Boards Amending Scheme (Scotland) Order 1998 (S.I. 1998 No. 496 (S.17)])
 The National Assistance (Assessment of Resources) (Amendment) Regulations 1998 (S.I. 1998 No. 497)
 The National Assistance (Sums forPersonal Requirements) Regulations 1998 (S.I. 1998 No. 498)
 The National Health Service (Optical Charges and Payments) Amendment Regulations 1998 (S.I. 1998 No. 499)
 The Shropshire's Community and Mental Health Services National Health Service Trust (Establishment) Order 1998 (S.I. 1998 No. 500)

501-600

 The Surrey Hampshire Borders National Health Service Trust (Establishment) Order 1998 (S.I. 1998 No. 501)
 The Dissolution of the North Downs Community Health National Health Service Trust and the Heathlands Mental Health National Health Service Trust Order 1998 (S.I. 1998 No. 502)
 The Pensions Increase (Review) Order 1998 (S.I. 1998 No. 503)
 The Building Societies (Accounts and Related Provisions) Regulations 1998 (S.I. 1998 No. 504)
 The Public Telecommunication System Designation (Telegroup UK Limited) Order 1998 (S.I. 1998 No. 505)
 The Public Telecommunication System Designation (Sonic Telecommunications International Limited) Order 1998 (S.I. 1998 No. 506)
 The Public Telecommunication System Designation (Primetec (UK) Limited) Order 1998 (S.I. 1998 No. 507)
 The Public Telecommunication System Designation (LCI Telecom UK Limited) Order 1998 (S.I. 1998 No. 508)
 The Public Telecommunication System Designation (Telecom Ireland Limited) Order 1998 (S.I. 1998 No. 509)
 The Public Telecommunication System Designation (Easynet Group Plc) Order 1998 (S.I. 1998 No. 510)
 The Public Telecommunication System Designation (Atlantic Telecommunications Limited) Order 1998 (S.I. 1998 No. 511)
 The Public Telecommunication System Designation (Esprit Telecom UK Limited) Order 1998 (S.I. 1998 No. 512)
 The Public Telecommunication System Designation (North American Gateway Limited) Order 1998 (S.I. 1998 No. 513)
 The Public Telecommunication System Designation (TGC UK Limited) Order 1998 (S.I. 1998 No. 514)
 The Shropshire's Community Health Service National Health Service Trust (Dissolution) Order 1998 (S.I. 1998 No. 515)
 The Dissolution of the South Warwickshire Health Care National Health Service Trust and the South Warwickshire Mental Health National Health Service Trust Order 1998 (S.I. 1998 No. 516)
 The South Warwickshire Combined Care National Health Service Trust (Establishment) Order 1998 (S.I. 1998 No. 517)
 The Shropshire's Mental Health National Health Service Trust (Dissolution) Order 1998 (S.I. 1998 No. 518)
 The Non-Domestic Rates (Levying) (Scotland) Regulations 1998 (S.I. 1998 No. 519 (S.18)])
 The Social Security (Industrial Injuries) (Dependency) (Permitted Earnings Limits) Order 1998 (S.I. 1998 No. 520)
 The Social Security Benefits Up-rating Regulations 1998 (S.I. 1998 No. 521)
 The Statutory Maternity Pay (Compensation of Employers) Amendment Regulations 1998 (S.I. 1998 No. 522)
 The Social Security (Contributions) Amendment Regulations 1998 (S.I. 1998 No. 523)
 The Social Security (Contributions) (Re-rating) Consequential Amendment Regulations 1998 (S.I. 1998 No. 524)
 The Public Processions (Northern Ireland) Act 1998 (Code of Conduct) Order 1998 (S.I. 1998 No. 525)
 The Public Processions (Northern Ireland) Act 1998 (Procedural Rules) Order 1998 (S.I. 1998 No. 526)
 The Public Processions (Northern Ireland) Act 1998 (Guidelines) Order 1998 (S.I. 1998 No. 527)
 The Motor Vehicles (Driving Licences) (Amendment) (No. 2) Regulations 1998 (S.I. 1998 No. 528)
 The Local Authorities (Capital Finance) (Rate of Discount for 1998/99) Regulations 1998 (S.I. 1998 No. 529)
 The Local Government Pension Scheme (Amendment) Regulations 1998 (S.I. 1998 No. 530)
 The Merchant Shipping (Fees) (Amendment) Regulations 1998 (S.I. 1998 No. 531)
 The Civil Aviation (Navigation Services Charges) Regulations 1998 (S.I. 1998 No. 532)
 The Local Authorities (Direct Labour Organisations) (Competition) (Insolvency) (Amendment) (Wales) Regulations 1998 (S.I. 1998 No. 537)
 The Financial Assistance for Environmental Purposes Order 1998 (S.I. 1998 No. 538)
 The Rhondda Health Care National Health Service Trust (Transfer of Trust Property) Order 1998 (S.I. 1998 No. 539)
 The Glan-y-Môr National Health Service Trust (Transfer of Trust Property) Order 1998 (S.I. 1998 No. 540)
 The Glan Hafren National Health Service Trust (Transfer of Trust Property) Order 1998 (S.I. 1998 No. 541)
 The Control of Lead at Work Regulations 1998 (S.I. 1998 No. 543)
 The Environmental Protection (Controls on Hexachloroethane) Regulations 1998 (S.I. 1998 No. 545)
 The Local Authorities (Members' Allowances) (Amendment) Regulations 1998 (S.I. 1998 No. 556)
 The Local Authorities (Members' Allowances) (Amendment) (No. 2) Regulations 1998 (S.I. 1998 No. 557)
 The Wireless Telegraphy (Television Licence Fees) (Amendment) Regulations 1998 (S.I. 1998 No. 558)
 The Local Government (Discretionary Payments) (Amendment) Regulations 1998 (S.I. 1998 No. 559)
 The Finance Act 1997 (Commencement No. 2) Order 1998 (S.I. 1998 No. 560 (C. 10)])
 The Council Tax (Exempt Dwellings) (Scotland) Amendment Order 1998 (S.I. 1998 No. 561 (S.19)])
 The Income-related Benefits (Subsidy to Authorities) Order 1998 (S.I. 1998 No. 562)
 The Social Security (Miscellaneous Amendments) Regulations 1998 (S.I. 1998 No. 563)
 The National Health Service (Remuneration and Conditions of Service) (Amendment) Regulations 1998 (S.I. 1998 No. 564)
 The Disability Discrimination (Repeal of section 17 of, and Schedule 2 to, the Disabled Persons (Employment) Act, 1944) Order 1998 (S.I. 1998 No. 565)
 The Housing Benefit (Permitted Totals) (Amendment) Order 1998 (S.I. 1998 No. 566)
 The A59 Trunk Road (A56 Junction Improvement) Order 1998 (S.I. 1998 No. 567)
 The Local Government Pension Scheme (Amendment) (Environment Agency) Regulations 1998 (S.I. 1998 No. 568)
 The London Docklands Development Corporation (Transfer of Property, Rights and Liabilities) (Urban Regeneration Agency) Order 1998 (S.I. 1998 No. 569)
 The Teesside Development Corporation (Transfer of Undertaking and Functions) Order 1998 (S.I. 1998 No. 570)
 The Workmen's Compensation (Supplementation) (Amendment) Scheme 1998 (S.I. 1998 No. 571)
 The Road Vehicles Registration Fee Regulations 1998 (S.I. 1998 No. 572)
 The Local Government Act 1988 (Defined Activities) (Exemption) (Tunbridge Wells Borough Council) Order 1998 (S.I. 1998 No. 573)
 The Medicines for Human Use and Medical Devices (Fees and Miscellaneous Amendments) Regulations 1998 (S.I. 1998 No. 574)
 The Road Traffic (Special Parking Areas) (The London Borough of Wandsworth) (Amendment) Order 1998 (S.I. 1998 No. 575)
 The Sunderland and Tyne Riverside Enterprise Zones (Designation of Enterprise Zone Authorities) Order 1998 (S.I. 1998 No. 576)
 The Police Pensions (Amendment) Regulations 1998 (S.I. 1998 No. 577)
 The Local Elections (Principal Areas) (Amendment) Rules 1998 (S.I. 1998 No. 578)
 The Local Government Act 1988 (Defined Activities) (Exemption) (No. 1) Order 1998 (S.I. 1998 No. 579)
 The Local Government Act 1988 (Defined Activities) (Exemption) (No. 2) Order 1998 (S.I. 1998 No. 580)
 The Injuries in War (Shore Employments) Compensation (Amendment) Scheme 1998 (S.I. 1998 No. 581)
 The Charter Trustees (Hereford) Order 1998 (S.I. 1998 No. 582)
 The Combined Probation Areas (Leicestershire and Rutland) Order 1998 (S.I. 1998 No. 584)
 The Local Elections (Parishes and Communities) (Amendment) Rules 1998 (S.I. 1998 No. 585)
 The Suspension from Work on Maternity Grounds (Merchant Shipping and Fishing Vessels) Order 1998 (S.I. 1998 No. 587)
 The Public Record Office (Fees) Regulations 1998 (S.I. 1998 No. 599)
 The Occupational and Personal Pension Schemes (Levy and Register) (Amendments) Regulations 1998 (S.I. 1998 No. 600)

601-700

 The Local Authorities (Capital Finance) (Amendment) (No. 2) Regulations 1998 (S.I. 1998 No. 602)
 The Forestry (Exceptions from Restrictions of Felling) (Amendment) Regulations 1998 (S.I. 1998 No. 603)
 The Environment Act 1995 (Commencement No. 11) Order 1998 (S.I. 1998 No. 604 (C.11)])
 The Controlled Waste (Registration of Carriers and Seizure of Vehicles) (Amendment) Regulations 1998 (S.I. 1998 No. 605)
 The Waste Management Licensing (Amendment) Regulations 1998 (S.I. 1998 No. 606)
 The Environmental Protection (Waste Recycling Payments) (Amendment) Regulations 1998 (S.I. 1998 No. 607)
 The Offshore Installations (Safety Zones) Order 1998 (S.I. 1998 No. 608)
 The National Health Service (Charges for Drugs and Appliances) (Scotland) Amendment Regulations 1998 (S.I. 1998 No. 609 (S.20)])
 The National Health Service (Dental Charges) (Scotland) Amendment Regulations 1998 (S.I. 1998 No. 610 (S.21)])
 The Police Grant (Scotland) Order 1998 (S.I. 1998 No. 611 (S.22)])
 The Insurance (Fees) Regulations 1998 (S.I. 1998 No. 612)
 The Museums and Galleries Act 1992 (Amendment) Order 1998 (S.I. 1998 No. 613)
 The Local Government Changes for England (Education) (Miscellaneous Provisions) Order 1998 (S.I. 1998 No. 614)
 The Adopted Persons (Contact Register) (Fees) (Amendment) Rules 1998 (S.I. 1998 No. 615)
 The Beef Labelling (Enforcement) Regulations 1998 (S.I. 1998 No. 616)
 The Superannuation (Admission to Schedule 1 to the Superannuation Act 1972) Order 1998 (S.I. 1998 No. 618)
 The A136 Trunk Road (Station Road, Parkeston) (Detrunking) Order 1998 (S.I. 1998 No. 630)
 The National Health Service (Primary Care) Act 1997 (Commencement No. 4) Order 1998 (S.I. 1998 No. 631 (C.12)])
 The National Health Service (Functions of Health Authorities) (Prescribing Incentive Schemes) Regulations 1998 (S.I. 1998 No. 632)
 The Water Services Charges (Billing and Collection) (Scotland) Order 1998 (S.I. 1998 No. 634 (S.25)])
 The Domestic Sewerage Charges (Reduction) (Scotland) Regulations 1998 (S.I. 1998 No. 635 (S.26)])
 The NCIS (Discipline) (Senior Police Members) Regulations 1998 (S.I. 1998 No. 636)
 The National Crime Squad (Discipline) (Senior Police Members) Regulations 1998 (S.I. 1998 No. 637)
 The National Crime Squad (Complaints) Regulations 1998 (S.I. 1998 No. 638)
 The National Crime Squad (Senior Police Members) (Appeals) Order 1998 (S.I. 1998 No. 639)
 The NCIS (Senior Police Members) (Appeals) Order 1998 (S.I. 1998 No. 640)
 The NCIS (Complaints) Regulations 1998 (S.I. 1998 No. 641)
 The National Health Service (Optical Charges and Payments) (Scotland) Regulations 1998 (S.I. 1998 No. 642 (S.23)])
 The Births, Deaths, Marriages and Divorces (Fees) (Scotland) Regulations 1998 (S.I. 1998 No. 643 (S.24)])
 The Local Education Authority (Behaviour Support Plans) Regulations 1998 (S.I. 1998 No. 644)
 The National Health Service (Pilot Schemes: Miscellaneous Provisions and Consequential Amendments) Regulations 1998 (S.I. 1998 No. 646)
 The Local Government Act 1988 (Defined Activities) (Exemption) (Basildon, Derwentside and Salisbury District Councils) Order 1998 (S.I. 1998 No.647)
 The Construction Contracts (England and Wales) Exclusion Order 1998 (S.I. 1998 No. 648)
 The Scheme for Construction Contracts (England and Wales) Regulations 1998 (S.I. 1998 No. 649)
 The Housing Grants, Construction and Regeneration Act (England and Wales) (Commencement No. 4) Order 1998 (S.I. 1998 No. 650 (C. 13)])
 The Surrey and Sussex Healthcare National Health Service Trust (Establishment) Order 1998 (S.I. 1998 No. 651)
 The Dissolution of the Surrey Heartlands National Health Service Trust and the East Surrey Priority Care National Health Service Trust Order 1998 (S.I. 1998 No. 652)
 The Surrey Oaklands National Health Service Trust (Establishment) Order 1998 (S.I. 1998 No. 653)
 The London Traffic Control System (Transfer) (Amendment) Order 1998 (S.I. 1998 No. 654)
 The Nursery Education (England) Regulations 1998 (S.I. 1998 No. 655)
 The Education (Grants for Education Support and Training) (England) Regulations 1998 (S.I. 1998 No. 656)
 The National Health Service (Service Committees and Tribunal) (Scotland) Amendment Regulations 1998 (S.I. 1998 No. 657 (S. 27)])
 The National Health Service (Fund-holding Practices) (Scotland) Amendment Regulations 1998 (S.I. 1998 No. 658 (S.28)])
 The National Health Service (Choice of Medical Practitioner) (Scotland) Regulations 1998 (S.I. 1998 No. 659 (S.29)])
 The National Health Service (General Medical Services) (Scotland) Amendment (No.2) Regulations 1998 (S.I. 1998 No. 660 (S.30)])
 The Nursing Homes Registration (Scotland) Amendment Regulations 1998 (S.I. 1998 No. 661 (S.31)])
 The Legal Aid in Criminal and Care Proceedings (General) (Amendment) Regulations 1998 (S.I. 1998 No. 662)
 The Legal Advice and Assistance (Amendment) Regulations 1998 (S.I. 1998 No. 663)
 The Civil Legal Aid (Assessment of Resources) (Amendment) Regulations 1998 (S.I. 1998 No. 664)
 The National Health Service (Pilot Schemes: Part II Practitioners) Regulations 1998 (S.I. 1998 No. 665)
 The National Health Service Pension Scheme (Amendment) Regulations 1998 (S.I. 1998 No. 666)
 The National Health Service (Injury Benefits) Amendment Regulations 1998 (S.I. 1998 No. 667)
 The National Health Service (Choice of Medical Practitioner) Regulations 1998 (S.I. 1998 No. 668)
 The National Health Service (Vocational Training for General Medical Practice) Amendment Regulations 1998 (S.I. 1998 No. 669)
 The North Wales Ambulance National Health Service Trust (Dissolution) Order 1998 (S.I. 1998 No. 670)
 The Mid Glamorgan Ambulance National Health Service Trust (Dissolution) Order 1998 (S.I. 1998 No. 671)
 The Industrial and Provident Societies (Credit Unions) (Amendment of Fees) Regulations 1998 (S.I. 1998 No. 672)
 The Friendly Societies (General Charge and Fees) Regulations 1998 (S.I. 1998 No. 673)
 The National Health Service (Service Committees and Tribunal) Amendment Regulations 1998 (S.I. 1998 No. 674)
 The Building Societies (General Charge and Fees) Regulations 1998 (S.I. 1998 No. 675)
 The Industrial and Provident Societies (Amendment of Fees) Regulations 1998 (S.I. 1998 No. 676)
 The West Wales Ambulance National Health Service Trust (Dissolution) Order 1998 (S.I. 1998 No. 677)
 The Welsh Ambulance Services National Health Service Trust (Establishment) Order 1998 (S.I. 1998 No. 678)
 The South and East Wales Ambulance National Health Service Trust (Dissolution) Order 1998 (S.I. 1998 No. 679)
 The Social Security (Contributions) Amendment (No. 2) Regulations 1998 (S.I. 1998 No. 680)
 The National Health Service (Pharmaceutical Services) Amendment Regulations 1998 (S.I. 1998 No. 681)
 The National Health Service (General Medical Services) Amendment Regulations 1998 (S.I. 1998 No. 682)
 The Porthmadog Harbour Revision Order 1998 (S.I. 1998 No. 683)
 The River Ewe Salmon Fishery District (Baits and Lures) Regulations 1998 (S.I. 1998 No. 684 (S. 32)])
 The Broadcasting Digital Terrestrial Sound (Technical Service) Order 1998 (S.I. 1998 No. 685)
 The Construction Contracts (Scotland) Exclusion Order 1998 (S.I. 1998 No. 686 (S.33)])
 The Scheme for Construction Contracts (Scotland) Regulations 1998 (S.I. 1998 No. 687 (S.34)])
 The Valuation and Rating (Exempted Classes) (Scotland) Order 1998 (S.I. 1998 No. 688 (S.35)])
 The Welfare Food (Amendment) Regulations 1998 (S.I. 1998 No. 691)
 The Dissolution of the Crawley Horsham National Health Service Trust and the East Surrey Healthcare National Health Service Trust Order 1998 (S.I. 1998 No. 692)
 The National Health Service (Fund-holding Amendment Regulations 1998 Practices) (S.I. 1998 No. 693)
 The Local Government and Rating Act 1997 (Commencement No. 4) Order 1998 (S.I. 1998 No. 694 (C.14)])
 The Local Government Act 1988 (Defined Activities) (Exemption) (Maidstone Borough Council) Order 1998 (S.I. 1998 No. 695)

701-800

 The Public Processions (Northern Ireland) Act 1998 (Commencement) Order 1998 (S.I. 1998 No. 717 (C.15)])
 The Teachers' Superannuation (Scotland) Amendment Regulations 1998 (S.I. 1998 No. 718 (S.36)])
 The Teachers (Compensation for Premature Retirement and Redundancy) (Scotland) Amendment Regulations 1998 (S.I. 1998 No. 719 (S.37)])
 The Wireless Telegraphy (Control of Interference from Videosenders) Order 1998 (S.I. 1998 No. 722)
 The Education (London Residuary Body) (Property Transfer) (Modification and Amendment) Order 1998 (S.I. 1998 No. 723)
 The Advice and Assistance (Scotland) Amendment Regulations 1998 (S.I. 1998 No. 724 (S.38)])
 The Civil Legal Aid (Scotland) Amendment Regulations 1998 (S.I. 1998 No. 725 (S.39)])
 The Industrial Training Levy (Engineering Construction Board) Order 1998 (S.I. 1998 No. 726)
 The Industrial Training Levy (Construction Board) Order 1998 (S.I. 1998 No. 727)
 The Retirement Benefits Schemes (Restriction on Discretion to Approve) (Small Self-administered Schemes) (Amendment) Regulations 1998 (S.I. 1998 No. 728)
 The Retirement Benefits Schemes (Restriction on Discretion to Approve) (Excepted Provisions) Regulations 1998 (S.I. 1998 No. 729)
 The European Communities (Designation) Order 1998 (S.I. 1998 No. 745)
 The Greater London Authority (Referendum Arrangements) Order 1998 (S.I. 1998 No. 746)
 Appropriation (Northern Ireland) Order 1998 (S.I. 1998 No. 747 (N.I. 3)])
 The Civil Aviation Act 1982 (Jersey) (Amendment) Order 1998 (S.I. 1998 No. 748)
 Financial Provisions (Northern Ireland) Order 1998 (S.I. 1998 No. 749 (N.I. 4)])
 The Misuse of Drugs Act 1971 (Modification) Order 1998 (S.I. 1998 No. 750)
 The United Reformed Church Acts 1972 and 1981 (Jersey) Order 1998 (S.I. 1998 No. 751)
 The Proceeds of Crime (Scotland) Act 1995 (Enforcement of Northern Ireland Orders) Order 1998 (S.I. 1998 No. 752 (S.42)])
 The Air Navigation (Third Amendment) Order 1998 (S.I. 1998 No. 753)
 The Northwick Park and St. Mark's National Health Service Trust (Establishment) Amendment Order 1998 (S.I. 1998 No. 754)
 The Income Tax (Indexation) Order 1998 (S.I. 1998 No. 755)
 The Inheritance Tax (Indexation) Order 1998 (S.I. 1998 No. 756)
 The Capital Gains Tax (Annual Exempt Amount) Order 1998 (S.I. 1998 No. 757)
 The Retirement Benefits Schemes (Indexationof Earnings Cap) Order 1998 (S.I. 1998 No. 758)
 The Value Added Tax (Cars) (Amendment) Order 1998 (S.I. 1998 No. 759)
 The Value Added Tax (Special Provisions) (Amendment) Order 1998 (S.I. 1998 No. 760)
 The Value Added Tax (Increase of Registration Limits) Order 1998 (S.I. 1998 No. 761)
 The Value Added Tax (Supply of Services) (Amendment) Order 1998 (S.I. 1998 No. 762)
 The Value Added Tax (Place of Supply of Services) (Amendment) Order 1998 (S.I. 1998 No. 763)
 The Value Added Tax (Sport, Sports Competitions and Physical Education) Order 1998 (S.I. 1998 No. 764)
 The Value Added Tax (Amendment) (No. 2) Regulations 1998 (S.I. 1998 No. 765)
 The Social Security Amendment (Lone Parents) Regulations 1998 (S.I. 1998 No. 766)
 The Environmental Protection (Prescribed Processes and Substances) (Amendment) (Hazardous Waste Incineration) Regulations 1998 (S.I. 1998 No. 767)
 The Prevention of Terrorism (Temporary Provisions) Act 1989 (Partial Continuance) Order 1998 (S.I. 1998 No. 768)
 The Urban Development Corporations in England (Area and Constitution) Order 1998 (S.I. 1998 No. 769)
 The Llandough Hospital and Community National Health Service Trust (Establishment) Amendment Order 1998 (S.I. 1998 No. 770)
 The National Health Service Trusts (Originating Capital Debt) (Wales) Order 1998 (S.I. 1998 No. 771)
 The Environment Act 1995 (Commencement No. 12 and Transitional Provisions) (Scotland) Order 1998 (S.I. 1998 No. 781 (S. 40) (C. 16)])
 The Combined Probation Areas (Hertfordshire) Order 1998 (S.I. 1998 No. 782)
 The Dissolution of the Royal Brompton Hospital National Health Service Trust and the Harefield Hospital National Health Service Trust Order 1998 (S.I. 1998 No. 783)
 The Royal Brompton and Harefield National Health Service Trust (Establishment) Order 1998 (S.I. 1998 No. 784)
 The Value Added Tax (Increase of Consideration for Fuel) Order 1998 (S.I. 1998 No. 788)
 The Education (New Grant-maintained Schools) (Finance) Regulations 1998 (S.I. 1998 No. 798)
 The Education (Grant-maintained and Grant-maintained Special Schools) (Finance) Regulations 1998 (S.I. 1998 No. 799)
 The Dissolution of the Ashford Hospital National Health Service Trust and the St. Peter's Hospital National Health Service Trust Order 1998 (S.I. 1998 No. 800)

801-900

 The Ashford and St. Peter's Hospitals National Health Service Trust (Establishment) Order 1998 (S.I. 1998 No. 801)
 The European Parliamentary Elections (Day of By-election) (Yorkshire South Constituency) Order 1998 (S.I. 1998 No. 802)
 The London Docklands Development Corporation (Transfer of Functions) Order 1998 (S.I. 1998 No. 803)
 The Hairmyres and Stonehouse Hospitals National Health Service Trust (Establishment) Amendment Order 1998 (S.I. 1998 No. 804 (S.41)])
 The Thames Gateway National Health Service Trust (Establishment) Order 1998 (S.I. 1998 No. 805)
 The Horton General Hospital National Health Service Trust (Dissolution) Order 1998 (S.I. 1998 No. 806)
 The Dissolution of the North Kent Healthcare National Health Service Trust and the Thameslink Healthcare Services National Health Service Trust Order 1998 (S.I. 1998 No. 807)
 The Housing Renewal Grants (Amendment) Regulations 1998 (S.I. 1998 No. 808)
 The Housing Renewal Grants (Prescribed Form and Particulars) (Amendment) Regulations 1998 (S.I. 1998 No. 809)
 The Relocation Grants (Form of Application) (Amendment) Regulations 1998 (S.I. 1998 No. 810)
 The European Primary and Specialist Dental Qualifications Regulations 1998 (S.I. 1998 No. 811)
 The Walsgrave Hospitals National Health Service Trust (Establishment) Amendment Order 1998 (S.I. 1998 No. 812)
 The Rugby National Health Service Trust (Dissolution) Order 1998 (S.I. 1998 No. 813)
 The North Warwickshire National Health Service Trust (Establishment) Amendment Order 1998 (S.I. 1998 No. 814)
 The Lancaster Priority Services National Health Service Trust (Dissolution) Order 1998 (S.I. 1998 No. 815)
 The Morecambe Bay Hospitals National Health Service Trust (Establishment) Order 1998 (S.I. 1998 No. 816)
 The Lancaster Acute Hospitals National Health Service Trust (Dissolution) Order 1998 (S.I. 1998 No. 817)
 The Westmorland Hospitals National Health Service Trust (Dissolution) Order 1998 (S.I. 1998 No. 818)
 The South Cumbria Community and Mental Health National Health Service Trust (Dissolution) Order 1998 (S.I. 1998 No. 819)
 The Furness Hospitals National Health Service Trust (Dissolution) Order 1998 (S.I. 1998 No. 820)
 The Bay Community National Health Service Trust (Establishment) Order 1998 (S.I. 1998 No. 821)
 The Community Health Care: North Durham National Health Service Trust (Dissolution) Order 1998 (S.I. 1998 No. 822)
 The Bishop Auckland Hospitals National Health Service Trust (Dissolution) Order 1998 (S.I. 1998 No. 823)
 The Gateshead Hospitals National Health Service Trust (Dissolution) Order 1998 (S.I. 1998 No. 824)
 The Cheviot and Wansbeck, North Tyneside Health Care, and Northumberland Community Health National Health Service Trusts (Dissolution) Order 1998 (S.I. 1998 No. 825)
 The Gateshead Healthcare National Health Service Trust (Dissolution) Order 1998 (S.I. 1998 No. 826)
 The Newcastle upon Tyne Hospitals National Health Service Trust (Establishment) Order 1998 (S.I. 1998 No. 827)
 The South Durham National Health Service Trust (Dissolution) Order 1998 (S.I. 1998 No. 828)
 The Durham County Priority Services National Health Service Trust (Establishment) Order 1998 (S.I. 1998 No. 829)
 The North Durham Acute Hospitals National Health Service Trust (Dissolution) Order 1998 (S.I. 1998 No. 830)
 The Freeman Group of Hospitals and the Royal Victoria Infirmary and Associated Hospitals National Health Service Trusts (Dissolution) Order 1998 (S.I. 1998 No. 831)
 The South Durham Health Care National Health Service Trust (Establishment) Order 1998 (S.I. 1998 No. 832)
 The Darlington Memorial Hospital National Health Service Trust (Dissolution) Order 1998 (S.I. 1998 No. 833)
 The Gateshead Health National Health Service Trust (Establishment) Order 1998 (S.I. 1998 No. 834)
 The North Durham Health Care National Health Service Trust (Establishment) Order 1998 (S.I. 1998 No. 835)
 The Northumbria Health Care National Health Service Trust (Establishment) Order 1998 (S.I. 1998 No. 836)
 The Leeds Teaching Hospitals National Health Service Trust (Establishment) Order 1998 (S.I. 1998 No. 837)
 The United Leeds Teaching Hospitals National Health Service Trust (Dissolution) Order 1998 (S.I. 1998 No. 838)
 The St. James and Seacroft University Hospitals National Health Service Trust (Dissolution) Order 1998 (S.I. 1998 No. 839)
 The Canterbury and Thanet Community Healthcare National Health Service Trust (Establishment) Amendment Order 1998 (S.I. 1998 No. 845)
 The South Kent Community Healthcare National Health Service Trust (Dissolution) Order 1998 (S.I. 1998 No. 846)
 The Southern Derbyshire Acute Hospitals National Health Service Trust (Establishment) Order 1998 (S.I. 1998 No. 848)
 The Derbyshire Royal Infirmary National Health Service Trust (Dissolution) Order 1998 (S.I. 1998 No. 849)
 The Derby City General Hospital National Health Service Trust (Dissolution) Order 1998 (S.I. 1998 No. 850)
 The Criminal Procedure and Investigations Act 1996 (Appointed Day No. 8) Order 1998 (S.I. 1998 No. 851 (C. 17)])
 The Video Recordings (Labelling) (Amendment) Regulations 1998 (S.I. 1998 No. 852)
 The Social Security (Miscellaneous Amendments) (No. 2) Regulations 1998 (S.I. 1998 No. 865)
 The A41 Trunk Road (Camden) (Temporary Prohibition of Traffic) (No.2) Order 1998 (S.I. 1998 No. 866)
 The London Borough of Haringey (Trunk Roads) Red Route (Bus Lanes) Traffic Order 1997 Variation Order 1998 (S.I. 1998 No. 867)
 The Local Authorities (Goods and Services) (Public Bodies) (No. 2) Order 1998 (S.I. 1998 No. 868)
 The Cattle Identification Regulations 1998 (S.I. 1998 No. 871)
 The Osteopaths Act 1993 (Commencement No. 2) Order 1998 (S.I. 1998 No. 872 (C.18)])
 The Housing Support Grant (Scotland) Variation Order 1998 (S.I. 1998 No. 873 (S.43)])
 The Housing Support Grant (Scotland) Order 1998 (S.I. 1998 No. 874 (S.44)])
 The Education (Listed Bodies) (Amendment) Order 1998 (S.I. 1998 No. 876)
 The Education (Individual Pupils' Achievements) (Information) (Amendment) Regulations 1998 (S.I. 1998 No. 877)
 The Wildlife and Countryside Act 1981 (Variation of Schedules 5 and 8) Order 1998 (S.I. 1998 No. 878)
 The Agriculture Act 1986 (Commencement No. 6)Order 1998 (S.I. 1998 No. 879 (C. 19)])
 The Education (Publication of Local Education Authority Inspection Reports) Regulations 1998 (S.I. 1998 No. 880)
 The Misuse of Drugs (Designation) (Variation) Order 1998 (S.I. 1998 No. 881)
 The Misuse of Drugs (Amendment) Regulations 1998 (S.I. 1998 No. 882)
 The A205 Trunk Road (Lambeth) Red Route (Prohibition of Traffic) Experimental Traffic Order 1998 (S.I. 1998 No. 883)
 The A205 Trunk Road (Lewisham) Red Route (Bus Lanes) Traffic Order 1998 (S.I. 1998 No. 884)
 Act of Sederunt (Rules of the Court of Session Amendment) (Miscellaneous) 1998 (S.I. 1998 No. 890 (S.45)])
 The Police Grant (No. 2) (Scotland) Order 1998 (S.I. 1998 No. 891 (S.46)])
 The Mines (Notice of Abandonment) Regulations 1998 (S.I. 1998 No. 892)
 The Northern Ireland Arms Decommissioning Act 1997 (Amnesty Period) Order 1998 (S.I. 1998 No. 893)
 The Housing Grants, Construction and Regeneration Act 1996 (Scotland) (Commencement No. 5) Order 1998 (S.I. 1998 No. 894 (C. 20) (S.47)])
 The Lewisham and Guy's Mental Health National Health Service Trust (Transfers of Trust Property) Order 1998 (S.I. 1998 No. 895)
 The Lincolnshire Ambulance and Health Transport Service National Health Service Trust (Transfer of Trust Property) Order 1998 (S.I. 1998 No. 896)
 The Special Trustees for University College Hospital (Transfer of Trust Property) Order 1998 (S.I. 1998 No. 897)
 The Local Government Staff Commission (England) (Winding Up) Order 1998 (S.I. 1998 No. 898)
 The Dual-Use and Related Goods (Export Control) (Amendment No. 2) Regulations 1998 (S.I. 1998 No. 899)
 The Legal Aid (Mediation in Family Matters) (Amendment) Regulations 1998 (S.I. 1998 No. 900)

901-1000

 The Pelican and Puffin Pedestrian Crossings General (Amendment) Directions 1998 (S.I. 1998 No. 901)
 The Residential Care Homes and the Nursing Homes and Mental Nursing Homes (Amendment) Regulations 1998 (S.I. 1998 No. 902)
 The Education (School Teachers' Pay and Conditions) Order 1998 (S.I. 1998 No. 903)
 The Northamptonshire County Council (A45 Nene Valley Way Widening) (Bridge Over The River Nene) Scheme 1997 Confirmation Instrument 1998 (S.I. 1998 No. 904)
 The Council Tax Benefit (General) Amendment Regulations 1998 (S.I. 1998 No. 911)
 The Monklands and Bellshill Hospitals National Health Service Trust (Establishment) (Change of Name and Amendment) Order 1998 (S.I. 1998 No. 922 (S.48)])
 The Conservation of Seals (Common Seals) (Shetland Islands Area) Order 1991 Revocation Order 1998 (S.I. 1998 No. 923 (S. 49)])
 The Employment Rights (Increase of Limits) Order 1998 (S.I. 1998 No. 924)
 The Trade Marks (Amendment) Rules 1998 (S.I. 1998 No. 925)
 The Law Hospital National Health Service Trust (Establishment) Amendment Order 1998 (S.I. 1998 No. 926 (S.50)])
 The Fishing Vessels (Life-Saving Appliances) (Amendment) Regulations 1998 (S.I. 1998 No. 927)
 The Fishing Vessels (Safety Provisions) (Amendment) Rules 1998 (S.I. 1998 No. 928)
 The Merchant Shipping (Crew Accommodation) (Fishing Vessels) (Amendment) Regulations 1998 (S.I. 1998 No. 929)
 The Fossil Fuel Levy Act 1998 (Commencement) Order 1998 (S.I. 1998 No. 930 (C.21)])
 The Legal Services Ombudsman (Jurisdiction) (Amendment) Order 1998 (S.I. 1998 No. 935)
 The A41 Trunk Road (Westminster) Red Route (No. 2) Traffic Order 1998 (S.I. 1998 No. 938)
 The A3 Trunk Road (Wandsworth) Red Route Experimental Traffic Order 1998 (S.I. 1998 No. 939)
 The Social Security (Minimum Contributions to Appropriate Personal Pension Schemes) Order 1998 (S.I. 1998 No. 944)
 The Social Security (Reduced Rates of Class 1 Contributions, and Rebates) (Money Purchase Contracted-out Schemes) Order 1998 (S.I. 1998 No. 945)
 The Railways (Rateable Values) (Scotland) Order 1998 (S.I. 1998 No. 947 (S.51)])
 The Local Authorities (Transport Charges) Regulations 1998 (S.I. 1998 No. 948)
 The Urban Development Corporations in England (Dissolution) Order 1998 (S.I. 1998 No. 953)
 The Fertilisers (Mammalian Meat and Bone Meal) Regulations 1998 (S.I. 1998 No. 954)
 The Fertilisers (Mammalian Meat and Bone Meal) (Conditions of Manufacture) Regulations 1998 (S.I. 1998 No. 955)
 The Public Processions (Northern Ireland) Act 1998 (Notice of Processions) (Exceptions) Order 1998 (S.I. 1998 No. 956)
 The Lifespan Health Care Cambridge National Health Service Trust (Establishment) Amendment Order 1998 (S.I. 1998 No. 957)
 The Gaming Clubs (Hours and Charges) (Amendment) Regulations 1998 (S.I. 1998 No. 961)
 The Gaming Act (Variation of Monetary Limits) Order 1998 (S.I. 1998 No. 962)
 The Road Traffic Act 1991 (Commencement No. 15 and Transitional Provisions) Order 1998 (S.I. 1998 No. 967 (C.22)])
 The Offshore Petroleum Production and Pipe-lines (Assessment of Environmental Effects) Regulations 1998 (S.I. 1998 No. 968)
 The Criminal Legal Aid (Scotland) (Prescribed Proceedings) Amendment Regulations 1998 (S.I. 1998 No. 969 (S.52)])
 The Civil Legal Aid (Financial Conditions) (Scotland) Regulations 1998 (S.I. 1998 No. 970 (S.53)])
 The Advice and Assistance (Financial Conditions) (Scotland) Regulations 1998 (S.I. 1998 No. 971 (S.54)])
 The Advice and Assistance (Assistance by Way of Representation) (Scotland) Amendment Regulations 1998 (S.I. 1998 No. 972 (S.55)])
 The East London and The City Health Authority (Transfers of Trust Property) Order 1998 (S.I. 1998 No. 977)
 The Street Works (Inspection Fees) (Amendment) Regulations 1998 (S.I. 1998 No. 978)
 The A205 Trunk Road (Greenwich) Red Route Experimental Traffic Order 1997 Variation Order 1998 (S.I. 1998 No. 979)
 The Exmouth Docks Harbour Revision Order 1998 (S.I. 1998 No. 980)
 Act of Sederunt (Rules of the Court of Session Amendment No.2) (Fees of Shorthand Writers) 1998 (S.I. 1998 No. 993 (S.56)])
 The Food Safety (Fishery Products and Live Shellfish) (Hygiene) Regulations 1998 (S.I. 1998 No. 994)
 The Road Vehicles Registration Fee (Amendment) Regulations 1998 (S.I. 1998 No. 995)
 The Consumer Credit (Increase of Monetary Limits) (Amendment) Order 1998 (S.I. 1998 No. 996)
 The Consumer Credit (Further Increase of Monetary Amounts) Order 1998 (S.I. 1998 No. 997)
 The Consumer Credit (Realisation of Pawn) (Amendment) Regulations 1998 (S.I. 1998 No. 998)
 Act of Sederunt (Fees of Shorthand Writers in the Sheriff Court) (Amendment) 1998 (S.I. 1998 No. 999 (S.57)])
 The Road Vehicles (Construction and Use) (Amendment No. 2) Regulations 1998 (S.I. 1998 No. 1000)

1001-1100

 The Financial Assistance for Environmental Purposes (No. 3) Order 1998 (S.I. 1998 No. 1001)
 The National Crime Squad Service Authority (Standing Orders) Regulations 1998 (S.I. 1998 No. 1002)
 The National Crime Squad Service Authority (Members' Interests) Regulations 1998 (S.I. 1998 No. 1003)
 The Housing Accommodation and Homelessness (Persons subject to Immigration Control) (Northern Ireland) Order 1998 (S.I. 1998 No. 1004)
 The Motor Vehicles (Type Approval) (Great Britain) (Amendment) Regulations 1998 (S.I. 1998 No. 1005)
 The Motor Vehicles (Type Approval for Goods Vehicles) (Great Britain) (Amendment) Regulations 1998 (S.I. 1998 No. 1006)
 The Antarctic (Amendment) Regulations 1998 (S.I. 1998 No. 1007)
 The Motor Vehicles (Approval) (Amendment) Regulations 1998 (S.I. 1998 No. 1008)
 The Public Entertainments Licences (Drug Misuse) Act 1997 (Commencement and Transitional Provisions) Order 1998 (S.I. 1998 No. 1009 (C.24)])
 The Firemen's Pension Scheme (Amendment) Order 1998 (S.I. 1998 No. 1010)
 The Merchant Shipping (Fire Protection: Small Ships) Regulations 1998 (S.I. 1998 No. 1011)
 The Merchant Shipping (Fire Protection: Large Ships) Regulations 1998 (S.I. 1998 No. 1012)
 The Fishing Vessels (Certification of Deck Officers and Engineer Officers) (Amendment) Regulations 1998 (S.I. 1998 No. 1013)
 The Immigration (Transit Visa) (Amendment No. 2) Order 1998 (S.I. 1998 No. 1014)
 The Channel Tunnel (Carriers' Liability) Order 1998 (S.I. 1998 No. 1015)
 The Port of Birkenhead Harbour Empowerment Order 1998 (S.I. 1998 No. 1016)
 The General Osteopathic Council (Transitional Period) (Application for Registration and Fees) Rules Order of Council 1998 (S.I. 1998 No. 1018)
 The General Osteopathic Council (Constitution and Procedure) Rules Order of Council 1998 (S.I. 1998 No. 1019)
 The General Osteopathic Council (Conditional Registration) Rules Order of Council 1998 (S.I. 1998 No. 1020)
 The Plants Breeders' Rights (Fees) Regulations 1998 (S.I. 1998 No. 1021)
 The Seeds (National Lists of Varieties) (Fees) (Amendment) Regulations 1998 (S.I. 1998 No. 1022)
 The Plant Breeders' Rights (Information Notices) (Extension to European Community Plant Variety Rights) Regulations 1998 (S.I. 1998 No. 1023)
 The Plant Breeders' Rights (Information Notices) Regulations 1998 (S.I. 1998 No. 1024)
 The Plant Breeders' Rights (Farm Saved Seed) (Specification of Species and Groups) Order 1998 (S.I. 1998 No. 1025)
 The Plant Breeders' Rights (Farm Saved Seed) (Specified Information) Regulations 1998 (S.I. 1998 No. 1026)
 The Plant Breeders' Rights Regulations 1998 (S.I. 1998 No. 1027)
 The Plant Varieties Act 1997 (Commencement) Order 1998 (S.I. 1998 No. 1028 (C.23)])
 The Road Works (Inspection Fees) (Scotland) Amendment Regulations 1998 (S.I. 1998 No. 1029 (S.58)])
 The London Cab Order 1998 (S.I. 1998 No. 1043)
 The Medicines (Exemptions for Merchants in Veterinary Drugs) Order 1998 (S.I. 1998 No. 1044)
 The Medicines (Sale or Supply) (Miscellaneous Provisions) Amendment Regulations 1998 (S.I. 1998 No. 1045)
 The Medicated Feedingstuffs Regulations 1998 (S.I. 1998 No. 1046)
 The Feedingstuffs (Zootechnical Products) Regulations 1998 (S.I. 1998 No. 1047)
 The Medicated Feedingstuffs and Feedingstuffs (Zootechnical Products) (Consequential Provisions) Regulations 1998 (S.I. 1998 No. 1048)
 The Feeding Stuffs (Establishments and Intermediaries) Regulations 1998 (S.I. 1998 No. 1049)
 The Merchant Shipping (Oil Pollution Preparedness, Response and Co-operation Convention) Regulations 1998 (S.I. 1998 No. 1056)
 The Carriage by Air Acts (Application of Provisions) (Fourth Amendment) Order 1998 (S.I. 1998 No. 1058)
 The European Communities (Definition of Treaties) (Partnership and Co-Operation Agreement between the European Communities and their Member States and Georgia) Order 1998 (S.I. 1998 No. 1059)
 The European Communities (Definition of Treaties) (Partnership and Co-operation Agreement between the European Communities and their Member States and the Republic of Armenia) Order 1998 (S.I. 1998 No. 1060)
 The European Communities (Definition of Treaties) (Partnership and Co-operation Agreement between the European Communities and their Member States and the Republic of Azerbaijan) Order 1998 (S.I. 1998 No. 1061)
 The European Communities (Definition of Treaties) (Europe Agreement establishing an Association between the European Communities and their Member States, and the Republic of Slovenia) Order 1998 (S.I. 1998 No. 1062)
 The European Communities (Definition of Treaties) (Partnership and Co-operation Agreement between the European Communities and their Member States and the Republic of Uzbekistan) Order 1998 (S.I. 1998 No. 1063)
 The Federal Republic of Yugoslavia (United Nations Sanctions) (Dependent Territories) Order 1998 (S.I. 1998 No. 1064)
 The Federal Republic of Yugoslavia (United Nations Sanctions) Order 1998 (S.I. 1998 No. 1065)
 The Hong Kong (Overseas Public Servants) (Pension Supplements) (Amendment) Order 1998 (S.I. 1998 No. 1066)
 The Merchant Shipping (Oil Pollution) (Pitcairn) (Amendment) Order 1998 (S.I. 1998 No. 1067)
 The Merchant Shipping (Oil Pollution) (Sovereign Base Areas) (Amendment) Order 1998 (S.I. 1998 No. 1068)
 The Activity Centres (Young Persons' Safety) (Northern Ireland) Order 1998 (S.I. 1998 No. 1069 (N.I. 5)])
 The Asylum and Immigration Act 1996 (Jersey) Order 1998 (S.I. 1998 No. 1070)
 The Family Homes and Domestic Violence (Northern Ireland) Order 1998 (S.I. 1998 No. 1071 (N.I. 6)])
 The Federal Republic of Yugoslavia (United Nations Sanctions) (Channel Islands) Order 1998 (S.I. 1998 No. 1072)
 The Federal Republic of Yugoslavia (United Nations Sanctions) (Isle of Man) Order 1998 (S.I. 1998 No. 1073)
 The Road Traffic (New Drivers) (Northern Ireland) Order 1998 (S.I. 1998 No. 1074 (N.I. 7)])
 The United Nations Personnel (Guernsey) Order 1998 (S.I. 1998 No. 1075)
 The Institute of Legal Executives Order 1998 (S.I. 1998 No. 1077)
 The Education (Inspectors of Schools in Wales) Order 1998 (S.I. 1998 No. 1078)
 The Local Government Finance (Scotland) Order 1998 (S.I. 1998 No. 1082 (S.59)])
 The Revenue Support Grant (Scotland) Order 1998 (S.I. 1998 No. 1083 (S.60))

1101-1200

 The Nurses, Midwives and Health Visitors (Professional Conduct) (Amendment) Rules 1998 Approval Order 1998 (S.I. 1998 No. 1103)
 The Special Trustees for the Middlesex Hospital (Transfer of Trust Property) Order 1998 (S.I. 1998 No. 1104)
 The A41 Trunk Road (Camden) Red Route Traffic Order 1998 (S.I. 1998 No. 1105)
 The A205 Trunk Road (Lewisham) Red Route (Cycle Lane) Traffic Order 1998 (S.I. 1998 No. 1106)
 The London Borough of Haringey (A10 Trunk Road) Red Route (Bus Lanes) Traffic Order 1998 (S.I. 1998 No. 1107)
 The Housing Renewal Grants (Prescribed Form and Particulars) (Welsh Form and Particulars) Regulations 1998 (S.I. 1998 No. 1113)
 The A420 Trunk Road (Majors Road Junction) Order 1998 (S.I. 1998 No. 1114)
 The Bank of England Act 1998 (Commencement) Order 1998 (S.I. 1998 No. 1120 (C.25)])
 The Plant Health (Great Britain) (Amendment) (No. 2) Order 1998 (S.I. 1998 No. 1121)
 The A205 Trunk Road (Lambeth) Red Route (Prescribed Routes and Prohibited Turns) Traffic Order 1998 (S.I. 1998 No. 1122)
 The Local Authorities (Goods and Services) (Public Bodies) (No. 3) Order 1998 (S.I. 1998 No. 1123)
 The Newport–Shrewsbury Trunk Road A4042 (Croes-y-Mwyalch Roundabout to Woodlands Roundabout) De-Trunking Order 1998 (S.I. 1998 No. 1124)
 The A205 Trunk Road (Wandsworth) Red Route (Clearway) Traffic Order 1998 (S.I. 1998 No. 1125)
 Northern Ireland Negotiations (Referendum) Order 1998 (S.I. 1998 No. 1126)
 Northern Ireland (Entry to Negotiations, etc.) Act 1996 (Cessation of Section 3) Order 1998 (S.I. 1998 No. 1127)
 The Income Support (General) (Standard Interest Rate Amendment) Regulations 1998 (S.I. 1998 No. 1128)
 The Bank of England Act 1998 (Consequential Amendments of Subordinate Legislation) Order 1998 (S.I. 1998 No. 1129)
 The Cash Ratio Deposits (Eligible Liabilities) Order 1998 (S.I. 1998 No. 1130)
 The Apple and Pear Orchard Grubbing Up Regulations 1998 (S.I. 1998 No. 1131)
 The Road Traffic (Special Parking Area) (London Borough of Sutton) Order 1998 (S.I. 1998 No. 1134)
 The Bovines and Bovine Products (Trade) Regulations 1998 (S.I. 1998 No. 1135)
 The National Health Service (Pilot Schemes—Health Service Bodies) Amendment Regulations 1998 (S.I. 1998 No. 1136)
 The Social Security Revaluation of Earnings Factors Order 1998 (S.I. 1998 No. 1137)
 The Osteopaths Act 1993 (Commencement No. 3) Order 1998 (S.I. 1998 No. 1138 (C.26)])
 The Penrhos Point Mussel Fishery Order 1998 (S.I. 1998 No. 1146)
 The Academic Awards and Distinctions (Queen Margaret College) (Scotland) Order of Council 1998 (S.I. 1998 No. 1148 (S.61)])
 The International Development Association (Eleventh Replenishment) Order 1998 (S.I. 1998 No. 1149)
 The A3 Trunk Road (Wandsworth) Red Route (Clearway) Traffic Order 1998 (S.I. 1998 No. 1150)
 The London Borough of Wandsworth (Trunk Roads) Red Route (Bus Lanes) Traffic Order 1998 (S.I. 1998 No. 1151)
 The Aviation Security (Air Cargo Agents) (Amendment) Regulations 1998 (S.I. 1998 No. 1152)
 The Merchant Shipping (Dangerous or Noxious Liquid Substances in Bulk) (Amendment) Regulations 1998 (S.I. 1998 No. 1153)
 The Packaging (Essential Requirements) Regulations 1998 (S.I. 1998 No. 1165)
 The Education (Mandatory Awards) Regulations 1998 (S.I. 1998 No. 1166)
 The Textile Products (Indications of Fibre Content) (Amendment) Regulations 1998 (S.I. 1998 No. 1169)
 The Coventry Healthcare National Health Service Trust (Establishment) Amendment Order 1998 (S.I. 1998 No. 1170)
 The Bromley Hospitals National Health Service Trust (Establishment) Amendment Order 1998 (S.I. 1998 No. 1171)
 The Rotherham Priority Health Services National Health Service Trust (Establishment) Amendment Order 1998 (S.I. 1998 No. 1172)
 The Social Security (Miscellaneous Amendments) (No.3) Regulations 1998 (S.I. 1998 No. 1173)
 The Social Security (Miscellaneous Amendments) (No. 4) Regulations 1998 (S.I. 1998 No. 1174)
 The Magistrates' Courts Committees (Merseyside) Amalgamation Order 1998 (S.I. 1998 No. 1175)
 The Magistrates' Courts Committees (West Midlands) Amalgamation Order 1998 (S.I. 1998 No. 1176)
 The Measuring Instruments (EEC Requirements) (Fees) Regulations 1998 (S.I. 1998 No. 1177)
 The Prescription Only Medicines (Human Use) Amendment (No. 2) Order 1998 (S.I. 1998 No. 1178)
 The Special Trustees for the Royal Hospital of St. Bartholomew (Transfer of Trust Property) Order 1998 (S.I. 1998 No. 1186)
 The Black Country Mental Health National Health Service Trust (Establishment) Amendment Order 1998 (S.I. 1998 No. 1187)
 The Road Vehicles (Construction and Use) (Amendment) (No. 3) Regulations 1998 (S.I. 1998 No. 1188)
 The Mental Health Review Tribunal (Amendment) Rules 1998 (S.I. 1998 No. 1189)
 The Local Land Charges (Amendment) Rules 1998 (S.I. 1998 No. 1190)
 The Legal Aid in Criminal and Care Proceedings (Costs) (Amendment) Regulations 1998 (S.I. 1998 No. 1191)
 The Local Government Act 1988 (Defined Activities) (Exemptions) (London Boroughs of Hillingdon and Hounslow, and Daventry and Horsham District Councils) Order 1998 (S.I. 1998 No. 1193)
 The Teacher Training Agency (Additional Functions) Order 1998 (S.I. 1998 No. 1194)
 The Cod (Specified Sea Areas) (Prohibition of Fishing) Order 1998 (S.I. 1998 No. 1195)
 The Town and Country Planning (Use Classes) (Scotland) Amendment Order 1998 (S.I. 1998 No. 1196 (S. 62)])
 The Insurance Companies (Loan Relationships) (Election for Accruals Basis) Order 1998 (S.I. 1998 No. 1200)

1201-1300

 The Pensions Appeal Tribunals (England and Wales) (Amendment) Rules 1998 (S.I. 1998 No. 1201)
 The Action Programme for Nitrate Vulnerable Zones (England and Wales) Regulations 1998 (S.I. 1998 No. 1202)
 The Consumer Credit Licensing (Appeals) Regulations 1998 (S.I. 1998 No. 1203)
 The A65 Trunk Road (Manor Park Improvement) Order 1993 (Revocation) Order 1998 (S.I. 1998 No. 1206)
 The A65 Trunk Road (Denton Bridge to Black Bull Farm) (Detrunking) Order 1993 (Revocation) Order 1998 (S.I. 1998 No. 1207)
 The Package Travel, Package Holidays and Package Tours (Amendment) Regulations 1998 (S.I. 1998 No. 1208)
 The Bristol City Docks Harbour Revision Order 1998 (S.I. 1998 No. 1209)
 The Sussex Sea Fisheries District (Constitution of Committee and Expenses) (Variation) Order 1998 (S.I. 1998 No. 1210)
 The Devon Sea Fisheries District (Variation) Order 1998 (S.I. 1998 No. 1211)
 The Kent and Essex Sea Fisheries District (Variation) Order 1998 (S.I. 1998 No. 1212)
 The Cumbria Ambulance Service National Health Service Trust (Establishment) Amendment Order 1998 (S.I. 1998 No. 1213)
 The Peterhead Harbours Revision Order 1998 (S.I. 1998 No. 1215 (S. 63)])
 The Education (Grants to Aided and Special Agreement Schools) Regulations 1998 (S.I. 1998 No. 1216)
 The Vehicle Excise Duty (Immobilisation, Removal and Disposal of Vehicles) (Amendment) Regulations 1998 (S.I. 1998 No. 1217)
 The Public Lending Right Scheme 1982 (Commencement of Variations) Order 1998 (S.I. 1998 No. 1218)
 The Judicial Pensions (Contributions) Regulations 1998 (S.I. 1998 No. 1219)
 The Education (Individual Performance Information) (Prescribed Bodies and Persons) (Wales) Regulations 1998 (S.I. 1998 No. 1220)
 Scrabster (Forward Supply Base) Harbour Revision Order 1998 (S.I. 1998 No. 1221 (S. 64)])
 The Education (Partnership Grant) Regulations 1998 (S.I. 1998 No. 1222)
 The A1089 and the A126 Trunk Roads (Tilbury) (Detrunking) Order 1998 (S.I. 1998 No. 1223)
 The Offshore Installations (Safety Zones) (No. 2) Order 1998 (S.I. 1998 No. 1224)
 The Pensions Appeal Tribunals (Scotland) (Amendment) Rules 1998 (S.I. 1998 No. 1225 (S.65)])
 The Town and Country Planning (General Permitted Development) (Scotland) Amendment Order 1998 (S.I. 1998 No. 1226 (S.66)])
 The Oxford Radcliffe Hospital National Health Service Trust (Change of Name) Order 1998 (S.I. 1998 No. 1227)
 The Seed Potatoes (Fees) Regulations 1998 (S.I. 1998 No. 1228)
 The Motor Vehicles (Driving Licences) (Amendment) (No. 3) Regulations 1998 (S.I. 1998 No. 1229)
 The Local Government Act 1988 (Defined Activities) (Exemptions) (Northumberland County Council and Suffolk Coastal District Council) Order 1998 (S.I. 1998 No. 1237)
 The Local Government Pension Scheme Regulations 1997 (Amendment) Regulations 1998 (S.I. 1998 No. 1238)
 The Education (London Residuary Body) (Property Transfer) (Modification) Order 1998 (S.I. 1998 No. 1239)
 The Broadcasting (Local Delivery Services) Order 1998 (S.I. 1998 No. 1240)
 The Hovercraft (Application of Enactments)(Amendment) Order 1998 (S.I. 1998 No. 1256)
 The Hovercraft (Convention on Limitation of Liability for Maritime Claims (Amendment)) Order 1998 (S.I. 1998 No. 1257)
 The Merchant Shipping (Convention on Limitation of Liability for Maritime Claims) (Amendment) Order 1998 (S.I. 1998 No. 1258)
 The European Communities (Enforcement of Community Judgments) (Amendment) Order 1998 (S.I. 1998 No. 1259)
 The Turks and Caicos Islands (Territorial Sea) (Amendment) Order 1998 (S.I. 1998 No. 1260)
 The Merchant Shipping (Oil Pollution) (Cayman Islands) Order 1998 (S.I. 1998 No. 1261)
 The Merchant Shipping (Oil Pollution) (Montserrat) Order 1998 (S.I. 1998 No. 1262)
 The Merchant Shipping (Oil Pollution) (Saint Helena) Order 1998 (S.I. 1998 No. 1263)
 The Asylum and Immigration Act 1996 (Guernsey) Order 1998 (S.I. 1998 No. 1264)
 The Employment Rights (Dispute Resolution) (Northern Ireland) Order 1998 (S.I. 1998 No. 1265 (N.I. 8)])
 The Football Spectators (Corresponding Offences in France) Order 1998 (S.I. 1998 No. 1266)
 The United Nations Personnel (Jersey) Order 1998 (S.I. 1998 No. 1267)
 The Visiting Forces (Designation) Order 1998 (S.I. 1998 No. 1268)
 The Cash Ratio Deposits (Value Bands and Ratios) Order 1998 (S.I. 1998 No. 1269)
 The Bank of England (Information Powers) Order 1998 (S.I. 1998 No. 1270)
 The Restriction on Agreements and Conduct (Specified Domestic Electrical Goods) Order 1998 (S.I. 1998 No. 1271)
 The Yorkshire Ouse (Pilotage Powers) Order 1998 (S.I. 1998 No. 1272)
 The A3 Trunk Road (Kingston upon Thames, Merton and Elmbridge) (50 m.p.h. Speed Limit) Order 1998 (S.I. 1998 No. 1273)
 The Social Security Amendment (New Deal) Regulations 1998 (S.I. 1998 No. 1274)
 The Right to Purchase (Prescribed Persons) (Scotland) Amendment Order 1998 (S.I. 1998 No. 1275 (S.67)])
 The Razor Shells, Trough Shells and Carpet Shells (Specified Sea Area) (Prohibition of Fishing) Order 1998 (S.I. 1998 No. 1276)
 The Food (Cheese) (Emergency Control) Order 1998 (S.I. 1998 No. 1277)
 The A23 Trunk Road (Croydon) Red Route (Prohibited Turns) Traffic Order 1998 (S.I. 1998 No. 1278)
 The Enfield Community Care National Health Service Trust (Establishment) Amendment Order 1998 (S.I. 1998 No. 1280)
 The Road Vehicles (Construction and Use) (Amendment) (No. 4) Regulations 1998 (S.I. 1998 No. 1281)
 The Disability Discrimination Act 1995 (Commencement No. 5) Order 1998 (S.I. 1998 No. 1282 (C.27)])
 The Food (Cheese) (Emergency Control) (Amendment) Order 1998 (S.I. 1998 No. 1284)
 The Oxfordshire Mental Healthcare National Health Service Trust (Establishment) Amendment Order 1998 (S.I. 1998 No. 1285)
 The Northern Ireland Referendum (Counting Officer's Charges) Order 1998 (S.I. 1998 No. 1286)
 The New Northern Ireland Assembly (Elections) Order 1998 (S.I. 1998 No. 1287)
 The Magistrates' Courts Committees (Merseyside) Amalgamation (Amendment) Order 1998 (S.I. 1998 No. 1293)
 The Value Added Tax (Osteopaths) Order 1998 (S.I. 1998 No. 1294)
 The Environmentally Sensitive Areas (England) Designation Orders (Revocation of Specified Provisions) Regulations 1998 (S.I. 1998 No. 1295)
 The Environmentally Sensitive Areas (West Penwith) Designation (Amendment) Order 1998 (S.I. 1998 No. 1296)
 The Environmentally Sensitive Areas (South Downs) Designation (Amendment) Order 1998 (S.I. 1998 No. 1297)
 The Environmentally Sensitive Areas (Somerset Levels and Moors) Designation (Amendment) Order 1998 (S.I. 1998 No. 1298)
 The Environmentally Sensitive Areas (The Broads) Designation (Amendment) Order 1998 (S.I. 1998 No. 1299)
 The Environmentally Sensitive Areas (Pennine Dales) Designation (Amendment) Order 1998 (S.I. 1998 No. 1300)

1301-1400

 The Environmentally Sensitive Areas (Lake District) Designation (Amendment) Order 1998 (S.I. 1998 No. 1301)
 The Environmentally Sensitive Areas (Exmoor) Designation (Amendment) Order 1998 (S.I. 1998 No. 1302)
 The Environmentally Sensitive Areas (North Peak) Designation (Amendment) Order 1998 (S.I. 1998 No. 1303)
 The Environmentally Sensitive Areas (North Kent Marshes) Designation (Amendment) Order 1998 (S.I. 1998 No. 1304)
 The Environmentally Sensitive Areas (South West Peak) Designation (Amendment) Order 1998 (S.I. 1998 No. 1305)
 The Environmentally Sensitive Areas (Breckland) Designation (Amendment) Order 1998 (S.I. 1998 No. 1306)
 The Environmentally Sensitive Areas (Avon Valley) Designation (Amendment) Order 1998 (S.I. 1998 No. 1307)
 The Environmentally Sensitive Areas (Test Valley) Designation (Amendment) Order 1998 (S.I. 1998 No. 1308)
 The Environmentally Sensitive Areas (South Wessex Downs) Designation (Amendment) Order 1998 (S.I. 1998 No. 1309)
 The Environmentally Sensitive Areas (Suffolk River Valleys) Designation (Amendment) Order 1998 (S.I. 1998 No. 1310)
 The Environmentally Sensitive Areas (Clun) Designation (Amendment)Order 1998 (S.I. 1998 No. 1311)
 The Strathspey Light Railway Order 1998 (S.I. 1998 No. 1312)
 The Northern Ireland (Elections) Act 1998(Commencement) Order 1998 (S.I. 1998 No. 1313 (C. 29)])
 The Home-Grown Cereals Authority (Rate of Levy) Order 1998 (S.I. 1998 No. 1314)
 The Retirement Benefits Schemes (Restriction on Discretion to Approve) (Small Self-administered Schemes) (Amendment No. 2) Regulations 1998 (S.I. 1998 No. 1315)
 The Broadcasting (Percentage of Digital Capacity for Radio Multiplex Licence) Order 1998 (S.I. 1998 No. 1326)
 The Countryside Stewardship Regulations 1998 (S.I. 1998 No. 1327)
 The General Osteopathic Council (Registration) Rules Order of Council 1998 (S.I. 1998 No. 1328)
 The General Osteopathic Council (Professional Indemnity Insurance) Rules Order of Council 1998 (S.I. 1998 No. 1329)
 The National Health Service (Pilot Schemes: Financial Assistance for Preparatory Work) Regulations 1998 (S.I. 1998 No. 1330)
 The Bolton Sixth Form College (Incorporation) Order 1998 (S.I. 1998 No. 1331)
 The Bolton Sixth Form College (Government) Regulations 1998 (S.I. 1998 No. 1332)
 The Special Immigration Appeals Commission Act 1997 (Commencement No. 1) Order 1998 (S.I. 1998 No. 1336 (C. 28)])
 The General Optical Council (Disciplinary Committee (Procedure) (Amendment) Rules) Order of Council 1998 (S.I. 1998 No. 1337)
 The General Optical Council (Disciplinary Committee (Constitution) Rules) Order of Council 1998 (S.I. 1998 No. 1338)
 The Local Government Changes for England (Disability Statements) Regulations 1998 (S.I. 1998 No. 1339)
 The Railways Regulations 1998 (S.I. 1998 No. 1340)
 The Queen Mary's Sidcup National Health Service Trust (Establishment) Amendment Order 1998 (S.I. 1998 No. 1341)
 The Food Protection (Emergency Prohibitions) (Paralytic Shellfish Poisoning) Order 1998 (S.I. 1998 No. 1342)
 The Secure Training Centres (Escorts) (Amendment) Rules 1998 (S.I. 1998 No. 1343)
 The Surface Waters (Dangerous Substances) (Classification) (Scotland) (No.2) Regulations 1998 (S.I. 1998 No. 1344 (S.68)])
 The Enforcement of Road Traffic Debts (Certificated Bailiffs) (Amendment) Regulations 1998 (S.I. 1998 No. 1351 (L.1)])
 The Control of Substances Hazardous to Health (Amendment) Regulations 1998 (S.I. 1998 No. 1357)
 The Fisheries and Aquaculture Structure (Grants) Amendment Regulations 1998 (S.I. 1998 No. 1365 (S.69)])
 The Value Added Tax (Reduced Rate) Order 1998 (S.I. 1998 No. 1375)
 The Plastic Materials and Articles in Contact with Food Regulations 1998 (S.I. 1998 No. 1376)
 The Merchant Shipping (Prevention of Pollution by Garbage) Regulations 1998 (S.I. 1998 No. 1377)
 The Social Security (Student Amounts Amendment) Regulations 1998 (S.I. 1998 No. 1379)
 The Local Government Act 1988 (Defined Activities) (Exemptions) (Combined Fire Authorities Etc.) Order 1998 (S.I. 1998 No. 1380)
 The Social Security (Claims and Payments) Amendment Regulations 1998 (S.I. 1998 No. 1381)
 The Restrictive Trade Practices (Standards) (Services) Order 1998 (S.I. 1998 No. 1394)
 The Restrictive Trade Practices (Standards) (Goods) Order 1998 (S.I. 1998 No. 1395)
 The Seeds (Fees) (Amendment) Regulations 1998 (S.I. 1998 No. 1396)
 The Occupational Pension Schemes (Contracting-out) (Amount Required for Restoring State Scheme Rights and Miscellaneous Amendment) Regulations 1998 (S.I. 1998 No. 1397)
 The Food Labelling (Amendment) Regulations 1998 (S.I. 1998 No. 1398)

1401-1500

 The Greenwich Healthcare National Health Service Trust (Establishment) Amendment Order 1998 (S.I. 1998 No. 1417)
 The Merchant Shipping (Navigation Bridge Visibility) Regulations 1998 (S.I. 1998 No. 1419)
 The Driving Licences (Community Driving Licence) Regulations 1998 (S.I. 1998 No. 1420)
 The Local Government (Exemption from Competition) (Scotland) Amendment Order 1998 (S.I. 1998 No. 1421 (S.70)])
 The Local Government Act 1988 (Competition) (Scotland) Amendment Regulations 1998 (S.I. 1998 No. 1422 (S.71)])
 The Local Government Act 1988 (Exemption for Works Contracts) (Scotland) Order 1998 (S.I. 1998 No. 1423 (S.72)])
 The National Health Service (Service Committees and Tribunal) (Scotland) Amendment (No.2) Regulations 1998 (S.I. 1998 No. 1424 (S.73)])
 The New Deal (Miscellaneous Provisions) (Amendment) Order 1998 (S.I. 1998 No. 1425)
 The Training for Work (Miscellaneous Provisions) (Amendment) Order 1998 (S.I. 1998 No. 1426)
 The Human Organ Transplants (Establishment of Relationship) Regulations 1998 (S.I. 1998 No. 1428)
 The Inheritance Tax (Delivery of Accounts) (Northern Ireland) Regulations 1998 (S.I. 1998 No. 1429)
 The Inheritance Tax (Delivery of Accounts) (Scotland) Regulations 1998 (S.I. 1998 No. 1430)
 The Inheritance Tax (Delivery of Accounts) Regulations 1998 (S.I. 1998 No. 1431)
 The Magistrates' Courts Committees (Devon and Cornwall) Amalgamation Order 1998 (S.I. 1998 No. 1432)
 The Merchant Shipping (Port State Control) (Amendment) Regulations 1998 (S.I. 1998 No. 1433)
 The Local Government Act 1988 (Defined Activities) (Exemption) (Walsall Metropolitan Borough Council) Order 1998 (S.I. 1998 No. 1434)
 The Channel Tunnel Rail Link (Qualifying Authorities) Order 1998 (S.I. 1998 No. 1445)
 The National Savings Stock Register (Closure of Register to Gilts) Order 1998 (S.I. 1998 No. 1446)
 The Environmental Information (Amendment) Regulations 1998 (S.I. 1998 No. 1447)
 The Road Humps (Scotland) Regulations 1998 (S.I. 1998 No. 1448 (S.74)])
 The Contracting Out (Functions Relating to National Savings) Order 1998 (S.I. 1998 No. 1449)
 The Treasury Bills (Amendment) Regulations 1998 (S.I. 1998 No. 1450)
 The National Health Service Superannuation Scheme (Scotland) (Additional Voluntary Contributions) Regulations 1998 (S.I. 1998 No. 1451 (S.75)])
 The National Health Service Trusts (Membership and Procedure) (Scotland) Amendment Regulations 1998 (S.I. 1998 No. 1458 (S.76)])
 The Health Boards (Membership and Procedure) (No.2) Amendment Regulations 1998 (S.I. 1998 No. 1459 (S.77)])
 The Mental Health Review Tribunals (Regions) Order 1998 (S.I. 1998 No. 1460)
 The Air Passenger Duty and Other Indirect Taxes (Interest Rate) Regulations 1998 (S.I. 1998 No. 1461)
 The A205 Trunk Road (Wandsworth and Richmond) Red Route Traffic Order 1998 (S.I. 1998 No. 1462)
 The Occupational Pension Schemes (Modification of the Pension Schemes Act 1993) Regulations 1998 (S.I. 1998 No. 1466)
 The Council Tax Limitation (Derbyshire County Council) (Maximum Amount) Order 1998 (S.I. 1998 No. 1468)
 The Electrical Equipment for Explosive Atmospheres (Certification) (Amendment) (No. 2) Regulations 1998 (S.I. 1998 No. 1469)
 The Education (Grants for Education Support and Training) (Wales) (Amendment) Regulations 1998 (S.I. 1998 No. 1489)
 The Magistrates' Courts Committees (Thames Valley) Amalgamation Order 1998 (S.I. 1998 No. 1492)
 The New Northern Ireland Assembly Elections (Returning Officer's Charges) Order 1998 (S.I. 1998 No. 1493)
 The Occupational Pension Schemes (Scheme Administration) Amendment Regulations 1998 (S.I. 1998 No. 1494)
 The Education (Assisted Places) (Scotland) Amendment Regulations 1998 (S.I. 1998 No. 1497 (S.78)])
 The St Mary's Music School (Aided Places) Amendment Regulations 1998 (S.I. 1998 No. 1498 (S.79)])
 The Army, Air Force and Naval Discipline Acts (Continuation) Order 1998 (S.I. 1998 No. 1499)
 The Merchant Shipping (Control of Pollution) (SOLAS) Order 1998 (S.I. 1998 No. 1500)

1501-1600

 The United Nations Arms Embargoes (Amendment) (Sierra Leone) Order 1998 (S.I. 1998 No. 1501)
 The United Nations Arms Embargoes (Dependent Territories) (Amendment) (Sierra Leone) Order 1998 (S.I. 1998 No. 1502)
 The Civil Aviation (Investigation of Air Accidents and Incidents) (Guernsey) Order 1998 (S.I. 1998 No. 1503)
 The Criminal Justice (Children) (Northern Ireland) Order 1998 (S.I. 1998 No. 1504 (N.I. 9)])
 The Geneva Conventions (Amendment) Act 1995 (Commencement) Order 1998 (S.I. 1998 No. 1505 (C.30)])
 The Social Security (Northern Ireland) Order 1998 (S.I. 1998 No. 1506 (N.I. 10)])
 The United Nations Arms Embargoes (Channel Islands) (Amendment) (Sierra Leone) Order 1998 (S.I. 1998 No. 1507)
 The United Nations Arms Embargoes (Isle of Man) (Amendment) (Sierra Leone) Order 1998 (S.I. 1998 No. 1508)
 The United Nations Personnel (Isle of Man) Order 1998 (S.I. 1998 No. 1509)
 The Wireless Telegraphy (Isle of Man) Order 1998 (S.I. 1998 No. 1510)
 The Wireless Telegraphy (Guernsey) Order 1998 (S.I. 1998 No. 1511)
 The Wireless Telegraphy (Jersey) Order 1998 (S.I. 1998 No. 1512)
 The Visiting Forces and Allied Headquarters (Income Tax and Capital Gains Tax) (Designation) Order 1998 (S.I. 1998 No. 1513)
 The Visiting Forces (Income Tax and Capital Gains Tax) (Designation) Order 1998 (S.I. 1998 No. 1514)
 The Visiting Forces and Allied Headquarters (Inheritance Tax) (Designation) Order 1998 (S.I. 1998 No. 1515)
 The Visiting Forces (Inheritance Tax) (Designation) Order 1998 (S.I. 1998 No. 1516)
 The Visiting Forces and Allied Headquarters (Stamp Duties) (Designation) Order 1998 (S.I. 1998 No. 1517)
 The Visiting Forces (Stamp Duties) (Designation) Order 1998 (S.I. 1998 No. 1518)
 The Railways (Amendment) Regulations 1998 (S.I. 1998 No. 1519)
 The Local Government Act 1988 (Defined Activities) (Exemptions) (London Fire and Civil Defence Authority) Order 1998 (S.I. 1998 No. 1528)
 The Deregulation (Deduction from Pay of Union Subscriptions) Order 1998 (S.I. 1998 No. 1529)
 The Export of Goods (Federal Republic of Yugoslavia) (Control) Order 1998 (S.I. 1998 No. 1530)
 The Federal Republic of Yugoslavia (Supply and Sale of Equipment) (Penalties and Licences) Regulations 1998 (S.I. 1998 No. 1531)
 The Education (School Performance Targets) (England) Regulations 1998 (S.I. 1998 No. 1532)
 The Loughborough College of Art and Design Higher Education Corporation (Dissolution) Order 1998 (S.I. 1998 No. 1533)
 The Civil Aviation (Route Charges for Navigation Services) (Amendment) Regulations 1998 (S.I. 1998 No. 1537)
 The Road Traffic (Permitted Parking Area and Special Parking Area) (City of Edinburgh) Designation Order 1998 (S.I. 1998 No. 1539 (S.80)])
 The Social Security Amendment (Personal Allowances for Children) Regulations 1998 (S.I. 1998 No. 1541)
 The Police (Health and Safety) Act 1997 (Commencement) Order 1998 (S.I. 1998 No. 1542 (C.31)])
 The Bradford Community Health National Health Service Trust (Establishment) Amendment Order 1998 (S.I. 1998 No. 1543)
 The Prison (Amendment) (No. 2) Rules 1998 (S.I. 1998 No. 1544)
 The Young Offender Institution (Amendment) Rules 1998 (S.I. 1998 No. 1545)
 The Dentists Act 1984 (Amendment) Order 1998 (S.I. 1998 No. 1546)
 The Electricity (Standards of Performance) (Amendment) Regulations 1998 (S.I. 1998 No. 1547)
 The Genetically Modified Organisms (Contained Use) (Amendment) Regulations 1998 (S.I. 1998 No. 1548)
 The Fire Services (Amendment) (Northern Ireland) Order 1998 (S.I. 1998 No. 1549 (N.I. 11)])
 The Financial Services (Designated Countries and Territories) (Overseas Insurance Companies) Order 1998 (S.I. 1998 No. 1550)
 The Education (Baseline Assessment) (England) Regulations 1998 (S.I. 1998 No. 1551)
 The Merchant Shipping (International Safety Management (ISM) Code) Regulations 1998 (S.I. 1998 No. 1561)
 The Local Government Reorganisation (Wales) (Repeal of Enactments) Order 1998 (S.I. 1998 No. 1562)
 The Road Vehicles (Construction and Use) (Amendment) (No. 5) Regulations 1998 (S.I. 1998 No. 1563)
 The A3 Trunk Road (Wandsworth) (Temporary Prohibition of Traffic) Order 1998 (S.I. 1998 No. 1564)
 The Meters (Approval of Pattern or Construction and Manner of Installation) Regulations 1998 (S.I. 1998 No. 1565)
 The Meters (Certification) Regulations 1998 (S.I. 1998 No. 1566)
 The Wireless Telegraphy (Licence Charges) (Amendment No. 2) Regulations 1998 (S.I. 1998 No. 1567)
 The Mines (Notification of Abandonment) (Scotland) Regulations 1998 (S.I. 1998 No. 1572 (S.81)])
 The Local Authorities (Goods and Services) (Public Bodies) (No. 4) Order 1998 (S.I. 1998 No. 1574)
 The Special Health Authorities (Amendment) Regulations 1998 (S.I. 1998 No. 1576)
 The Special Health Authorities (Establishment and Constitution Orders) Amendment Order 1998 (S.I. 1998 No. 1577)
 The Homelessness (Decisions on Referrals) Order 1998 (S.I. 1998 No. 1578)
 The Telecommunications (Open Network Provision) (Voice Telephony) Regulations 1998 (S.I. 1998 No. 1580)
 The Child Benefit and Social Security (Fixing and Adjustment of Rates) (Amendment) Regulations 1998 (S.I. 1998 No. 1581)
 The Food Protection (Emergency Prohibitions) (Paralytic Shellfish Poisoning) (No.2) Order 1998 (S.I. 1998 No. 1582)
 The Education (Grants) (Music, Ballet and Choir Schools) (Amendment) Regulations 1998 (S.I. 1998 No. 1583)
 The Education (Teachers) (Amendment) Regulations 1998 (S.I. 1998 No. 1584)
 The Education (Assisted Places) (Incidental Expenses) (Amendment) Regulations 1998 (S.I. 1998 No. 1585)
 The Local Government Act 1988 (Defined Activities) (Exemptions) (Dacorum, Hertsmere and Luton Borough Councils) Order 1998 (S.I. 1998 No. 1586)
 The Vaccine Damage Payments Act 1979 Statutory Sum Order 1998 (S.I. 1998 No. 1587)
 The M3 Motorway (Minley Interchange Connecting Roads) Scheme 1998 (S.I. 1998 No. 1588)
 The Prisons and Young Offenders Institutions (Scotland) Amendment Rules 1998 (S.I. 1998 No. 1589 (S.82)])
 The National Health Service Superannuation Scheme (Scotland) Amendment Regulations 1998 (S.I. 1998 No. 1593 (S. 83)])
 The National Health Service (Scotland) (Injury Benefits) Regulations 1998 (S.I. 1998 No. 1594 (S. 84)])
 The New Opportunities Fund (Specification of Initiatives) Order 1998 (S.I. 1998 No. 1598)
 The Football Spectators (Seating) Order 1998 (S.I. 1998 No. 1599)
 The National Health Service (General Medical Services) (Scotland) Amendment (No.3) Regulations 1998 (S.I. 1998 No. 1600 (S.85))

1601-1700

 The Safety of Sports Grounds (Designation) (Scotland) Order 1998 (S.I. 1998 No. 1601 (S.86)])
 The Deregulation (Methylated Spirits Sale by Retail) (Scotland) Order 1998 (S.I. 1998 No. 1602 (S.87)])
 The Homelessness (Decisions on Referrals) (Scotland) Order 1998 (S.I. 1998 No. 1603 (S.88)])
 The Swansea Bay Port Health Authority (Amendment) Order 1998 (S.I. 1998 No. 1604)
 The Organic Farming (Aid) (Amendment) Regulations 1998 (S.I. 1998 No. 1606)
 The Education (Start of Compulsory School Age) Order 1998 (S.I. 1998 No. 1607)
 The North Bolton Sixth Form College and South College, Bolton (Dissolution) Order 1998 (S.I. 1998 No. 1608)
 The Merchant Shipping (Small Workboats and Pilot Boats) Regulations 1998 (S.I. 1998 No. 1609)
 The Anglian Regional Flood Defence Committee Order 1998 (S.I. 1998 No. 1636)
 The North West Regional Flood Defence Committee Order 1998 (S.I. 1998 No. 1637)
 The Severn-Trent Regional Flood Defence Committee Order 1998 (S.I. 1998 No. 1638)
 The Southern Regional Flood Defence Committee Order 1998 (S.I. 1998 No. 1639)
 The South West Regional Flood Defence Committee Order 1998 (S.I. 1998 No. 1640)
 The Thames Regional Flood Defence Committee Order 1998 (S.I. 1998 No. 1641)
 The A4 Trunk Road (Hounslow) Red Route (Clearway) Traffic Order 1996 Variation Order 1998 (S.I. 1998 No. 1642)
 The Federal Republic of Yugoslavia and Serbia (Freezing of Funds) Regulations 1998 (S.I. 1998 No. 1643)
 The Moray House Institute of Education (Closure) (Scotland) Order 1998 (S.I. 1998 No. 1644 (S. 89)])
 The Sheep and Goats Spongiform EncephalopathyOrder 1998 (S.I. 1998 No. 1645)
 The Sheep and Goats Spongiform Encephalopathy Regulations 1998 (S.I. 1998 No. 1646)
 The Sheep and Goats Spongiform Encephalopathy (Compensation) Order 1998 (S.I. 1998 No. 1647)
 The National Health Service (General Dental Services) Amendment Regulations 1998 (S.I. 1998 No. 1648)
 The Control of Pollution (Channel Tunnel Rail Link) Regulations 1998 (S.I. 1998 No. 1649)
 The Protection of Wrecks (Designation No. 1) Order 1998 (S.I. 1998 No. 1650)
 The Cambridgeshire College of Agriculture and Horticulture (Dissolution) Order 1998 (S.I. 1998 No. 1651)
 The Newton Rigg College, Penrith (Dissolution) Order 1998 (S.I. 1998 No. 1652)
 The High Peak College, Buxton (Dissolution) Order 1998 (S.I. 1998 No. 1653)
 The Airedale and Wharfedale College (Dissolution) Order 1998 (S.I. 1998 No. 1654)
 The Basford Hall College, Nottingham (Dissolution) Order 1998 (S.I. 1998 No. 1655)
 The East Birmingham College (Dissolution) Order 1998 (S.I. 1998 No. 1656)
 The Harrogate College (Dissolution) Order 1998 (S.I. 1998 No. 1657)
 The Employment Rights (Dispute Resolution) Act 1998 (Commencement No. 1 and Transitional and Saving Provisions) Order 1998 (S.I. 1998 No. 1658 (C.32)])
 The Sports Grounds and Sporting Events (Designation) (Scotland) Amendment Order 1998 (S.I. 1998 No. 1659 (S. 90)])
 The Offshore Installations (Safety Zones) (No. 3) Order 1998 (S.I. 1998 No. 1660)
 The Local Government Act 1988 (Defined Activities) (Exemption) (Bournemouth Borough Council and North West Leicestershire District Council) Order 1998 (S.I. 1998 No. 1661)
 The National Health Service (General Dental Services) (Scotland) Amendment Regulations 1998 (S.I. 1998 No. 1663 (S. 91)])
 The Medical Act 1983 (Approved Medical Practices and Conditions of Residence) and National Health Service (General Medical Services) (Amendment) Regulations 1998 (S.I. 1998 No. 1664)
 The Eggs (Marketing Standards) (Amendment) Regulations 1998 (S.I. 1998 No. 1665)
 The Medical Act 1983 (Approved Medical Practices and Conditions of Residence) and National Health Service (General Medical Services) (Scotland) Amendment Regulations 1998 (S.I. 1998 No. 1667 (S. 92)])
 The Public Service Vehicles (Conditions of Fitness, Equipment, Use and Certification) (Amendment) Regulations 1998 (S.I. 1998 No. 1670)
 The Goods Vehicles (Plating and Testing) (Amendment) Regulations 1998 (S.I. 1998 No. 1671)
 The Motor Vehicles (Tests) (Amendment) Regulations 1998 (S.I. 1998 No. 1672)
 The Food (Cheese) (Emergency Control) (Amendment No. 2) Order 1998 (S.I. 1998 No. 1673)
 The Animals (Scientific Procedures) Act (Amendment to Schedule 2) Order 1998 (S.I. 1998 No. 1674)
 The Export and Investment Guarantees (Limit on Foreign Currency Commitments) Order 1998 (S.I. 1998 No. 1675)
 The Education (Student Loans) (Amendment) Regulations 1998 (S.I. 1998 No. 1676)
 The Northern Ireland Act 1974 (Interim Period Extension) Order 1998 (S.I. 1998 No. 1677)
 The Children (Performances) (Miscellaneous Amendments) Regulations 1998 (S.I. 1998 No. 1678)
 The Merchant Shipping (Distress Messages) Regulations 1998 (S.I. 1998 No. 1691)
 The Merchant Shipping (Co-operation with Search and Rescue Services) Regulations 1998 (S.I. 1998 No. 1692)
 The Jobseeker's Allowance (Amendment) (No. 2) Regulations 1998 (S.I. 1998 No. 1698)

1701-1800

 The Noise Insulation (Railways and Other Guided Transport Systems) (Amendment) Regulations 1998 (S.I. 1998 No. 1701)
 The Companies (Forms) (Amendment) Regulations 1998 (S.I. 1998 No. 1702)
 The Wireless Telegraphy (Licence Charges) (Amendment No. 3) Regulations 1998 (S.I. 1998 No. 1703)
 The Combined Probation Areas (North Yorkshire) Order 1998 (S.I. 1998 No. 1704)
 The A205 Trunk Road (Lewisham) Red Route (Prescribed Route) Experimental Traffic Order 1998 (S.I. 1998 No. 1705)
 The A23 Trunk Road (Croydon) Red Route (No. 2) Experimental Traffic Order 1997 Variation Order 1998 (S.I. 1998 No. 1706)
 The M4 Motorway (Hillingdon and Hounslow) (Speed Limits) Regulations 1998 (S.I. 1998 No. 1708)
 The Welfare of Livestock (Amendment) Regulations 1998 (S.I. 1998 No. 1709)
 The Ecclesiastical Judges and Legal Officers (Fees) Order 1998 (S.I. 1998 No. 1711)
 The Legal Officers (Annual Fees) Order 1998 (S.I. 1998 No. 1712)
 The Faculty Jurisdiction (Appeals) Rules 1998 (S.I. 1998 No. 1713)
 The Parochial Fees Order 1998 (S.I. 1998 No. 1714)
 The National Institutions of The Church of England (Transfer of Functions) Order 1998 (S.I. 1998 No. 1715)
 The Education (Assisted Places) (Amendment) Regulations 1998 (S.I. 1998 No. 1726)
 The Cosmetic Products (Safety) (Amendment) Regulations 1998 (S.I. 1998 No. 1727)
 The Social Security (Categorisation of Earners) Amendment Regulations 1998 (S.I. 1998 No. 1728)
 The Teaching and Higher Education Act 1998 (Commencement No.1) Order 1998 (S.I. 1998 No. 1729 (C.33) (S.93)])
 The National Assistance (Assessment of Resources) (Amendment No. 2) Regulations 1998 (S.I. 1998 No. 1730)
 The Environmental Assessment (Forestry) Regulations 1998 (S.I. 1998 No. 1731)
 The Housing Benefit (General) Amendment Regulations 1998 (S.I. 1998 No. 1732)
 The East Berkshire Community Health National Health Service Trust (Establishment) Amendment Order 1998 (S.I. 1998 No. 1733)
 The A13 Trunk Road (Ironbridge to Canning Town Improvement, Trunk Road, Slip Roads and Bridges) Order 1998 (S.I. 1998 No. 1734)
 The Education (Grants for Education Support and Training) (England) Regulations 1998 (Amendment) Regulations 1998 (S.I. 1998 No. 1741)
 The Protection of Wrecks (Designation No. 2) Order 1984 (Amendment) Order 1998 (S.I. 1998 No. 1746)
 The Companies Act 1989 (Commencement No. 17) Order 1998 (S.I. 1998 No. 1747 (C.34)])
 The Financial Markets and Insolvency Regulations 1998 (S.I. 1998 No. 1748)
 The Government Stock (Amendment) Regulations 1998 (S.I. 1998 No. 1749)
 The European Communities (Designation) (No. 2) Order 1998 (S.I. 1998 No. 1750)
 Air Carrier Liability Order 1998 (S.I. 1998 No. 1751)
 The Angola (United Nations Sanctions) Order 1998 (S.I. 1998 No. 1752)
 The Angola (United Nations Sanctions) (Dependent Territories) Order 1998 (S.I. 1998 No. 1753)
 The Geneva Conventions Act (First Protocol) Order 1998 (S.I. 1998 No. 1754)
 The United Nations (International Tribunals) (Former Yugoslavia and Rwanda) (Amendment) Order 1998 (S.I. 1998 No. 1755)
 The Angola (United Nations Sanctions) (Channel Islands) Order 1998 (S.I. 1998 No. 1756)
 The Angola (United Nations Sanctions) (Isle of Man) Order 1998 (S.I. 1998 No. 1757)
 The Appropriation (No. 2) (Northern Ireland) Order 1998 (S.I. 1998 No. 1758 (N.I. 12)])
 Education (Northern Ireland) Order 1998 (S.I. 1998 No. 1759 (N.I. 13)])
 The Education (Student Support) (Northern Ireland) Order 1998 (S.I. 1998 No. 1760 (N.I. 14)])
 The Employment Rights (Time off for Study or Training) (Northern Ireland) Order 1998 (S.I. 1998 No. 1761 (N.I. 15)])
 Producer Responsibility Obligations (Northern Ireland) Order 1998 (S.I. 1998 No. 1762 (N.I. 16)])
 The Public Interest Disclosure (Northern Ireland) Order 1998 (S.I. 1998 No. 1763 (N.I. 17)])
 The Trial of the Pyx Order 1998 (S.I. 1998 No. 1764)
 The Education (Inspectors of Schools in Wales) (No. 2) Order 1998 (S.I. 1998 No. 1765)
 The Housing Act 1996 (Commencement No. 12 and Transitional Provision) Order 1998 (S.I. 1998 No. 1768 (C.35)])
 The Sheffield City Airport Licensing (Liquor) Order 1998 (S.I. 1998 No. 1769)
 The Trade Marks (Fees) Rules 1998 (S.I. 1998 No. 1776)
 The Registered Designs (Fees) Rules 1998 (S.I. 1998 No. 1777)
 The Patents (Fees) Rules 1998 (S.I. 1998 No. 1778)
 The Gas Act 1986 (Exemption) Order 1998 (S.I. 1998 No. 1779)
 The Merchant Shipping (Liability of Shipowners and Others) (Rate of Interest) Order 1998 (S.I. 1998 No. 1795)
 The Cattle Database Regulations 1998 (S.I. 1998 No. 1796)
 The Humber Bridge (Debts) Order 1998 (S.I. 1998 No. 1797)
 The Hertfordshire (Coroners' Districts) (Amendment) Order 1998 (S.I. 1998 No. 1799)
 The Environmentally Sensitive Areas (Cotswold Hills) Designation (Amendment) Order 1998 (S.I. 1998 No. 1800)

1801-1900
 The Food Protection (Emergency Prohibitions) (Paralytic Shellfish Poisoning) Order 1998 Partial Revocation Order 1998 (S.I. 1998 No. 1801)
 The Restriction of Liberty Order (Scotland) Regulations 1998 (S.I. 1998 No. 1802 (S. 94)])
 The Environmentally Sensitive Areas (Upper Thames Tributaries) Designation (Amendment) Order 1998 (S.I. 1998 No. 1803)
 The Local Government (Direct Labour Organisations) (Competition) (Insolvency) (Amendment) (England) Regulations 1998 (S.I. 1998 No. 1805)
 The Local Government Act 1988(Defined Activities) (Exemption) (Insolvency) (England and Wales) Order 1998 (S.I. 1998 No. 1806)
 The Motor Cycles (Protective Helmets) Regulations 1998 (S.I. 1998 No. 1807)
 The A10 Trunk Road (Haringey) Red Route (Prohibited Turn) Traffic Order 1998 (S.I. 1998 No. 1808)
 The A2 Trunk Road (Bexley) Red Route Traffic Order 1996 Variation Order 1998 (S.I. 1998 No. 1809)
 The Land Registration (Scotland) Act 1979 (Commencement No.11) Order 1998 (S.I. 1998 No. 1810 (C.36) (S.95)])
 The Social Security (Guardian's Allowances) Amendment Regulations 1998 (S.I. 1998 No. 1811)
 The Houses in Multiple Occupation (Charges for Registration Schemes) Regulations 1998 (S.I. 1998 No. 1812)
 The Houses in Multiple Occupation (Fees for Registration Schemes) (Amendment) Order 1998 (S.I. 1998 No. 1813)
 Coventry Airport (Designation) (Detention and Sale of Aircraft) Order 1998 (S.I. 1998 No. 1827)
 The Fossil Fuel Levy (Amendment) Regulations 1998 (S.I. 1998 No. 1828)
 The Local Government Pension Scheme(Management and Investment of Funds) Regulations 1998 (S.I. 1998 No. 1831)
 The Working Time Regulations 1998 (S.I. 1998 No. 1833)
 The Education (Individual Performance Information) (Identification of Individual Pupils) Regulations 1998 (S.I. 1998 No. 1834)
 The A205 Trunk Road (Lewisham) Red Route Traffic Order 1998 (S.I. 1998 No. 1835)
 The Building Act 1984 (Commencement No. 2) Order 1998 (S.I. 1998 No. 1836 (C. 37)])
 The Magistrates' Courts (Procedure) Act 1998 (Commencement No. 1) Order 1998 (S.I. 1998 No. 1837 (C.38)])
 The Merchant Shipping (Code of Safe Working Practices for Merchant Seamen) Regulations 1998 (S.I. 1998 No. 1838)
 The Amusement Machine Licence Duty (Monetary Amounts) Order 1998 (S.I. 1998 No. 1839)
 The Pneumoconiosis etc. (Workers’ Compensation) (Payment of Claims) Amendment Regulations 1998 (S.I. 1998 No. 1840)
 The Royal Infirmary of Edinburgh National Health Service Trust (Establishment) Amendment Order 1998 (S.I. 1998 No. 1841 (S.96)])
 Act of Adjournal (Criminal Procedure Rules Amendment) (Restriction of Liberty Orders) 1998 (S.I. 1998 No. 1842 (S.97)])
 The Safety of Sports Grounds (Designation) Order 1998 (S.I. 1998 No. 1845)
 The Occupational Pension Schemes (Validation of Rule Alterations) Regulations 1998 (S.I. 1998 No. 1846)
 The International Monetary Fund (Increase in Subscription) Order 1998 (S.I. 1998 No. 1854)
 The West of Scotland Water Authority (Loch Lossit, Islay) (Amendment) Water Order 1998 (S.I. 1998 No. 1855 (S.98)])
 The Private Water Supplies (Scotland) Amendment Regulations 1998 (S.I. 1998 No. 1856 (S. 99)])
 The Northern Ireland (Sentences) Act 1998 (Commencement) Order 1998 (S.I. 1998 No. 1858 (C.39)])
 The Northern Ireland (Sentences) Act 1998 (Sentence Review Commissioners) Rules 1998 (S.I. 1998 No. 1859)
 The Conditional Fee Agreements Order 1998 (S.I. 1998 No. 1860)
 The Local Government Act 1988 (Defined Activities) (Exemption) (Cherwell District Council) Order 1998 (S.I. 1998 No. 1862)
 The Foreign Satellite Service Proscription Order 1998 (S.I. 1998 No. 1865)
 The Education (School Inspection) (Wales) Regulations 1998 (S.I. 1998 No. 1866)
 The Education (School Performance Information) (Wales) Regulations 1998 (S.I. 1998 No. 1867)
 The Gifts for Relief in Poor Countries (Designation) Order 1998 (S.I. 1998 No. 1868)
 The Personal Equity Plan (Amendment) Regulations 1998 (S.I. 1998 No. 1869)
 The Individual Savings Account Regulations 1998 (S.I. 1998 No. 1870)
 The Individual Savings Account (Insurance Companies) Regulations 1998 (S.I. 1998 No. 1871)
 The Insurance Companies (Overseas Life Assurance Business) (Compliance) (Amendment) Regulations 1998 (S.I. 1998 No. 1872)
 The Republic of Serbia (Prohibition on Investment) Regulations 1998 (S.I. 1998 No. 1873)
 The Education (Grants for Early Excellence Centres) (England) Regulations 1998 (S.I. 1998 No. 1877)
 The School Standards and Framework Act 1998 (Education Action Zones) (Modification) Regulations 1998 (S.I. 1998 No. 1878)
 The Superannuation (Admission to Schedule 1 to the Superannuation Act 1972) (No. 2) Order 1998 (S.I. 1998 No. 1879)
 The Civil Courts (Amendment) Order 1998 (S.I. 1998 No. 1880)
 The Special Immigration Appeals Commission (Procedure) Rules 1998 (S.I. 1998 No. 1881)
 The Northern Ireland (Sentences) Act 1998 (S.I. 1998 No. 1882)
 The Crime and Disorder Act 1998 (Commencement No. 1) Order 1998 (S.I. 1998 No. 1883 (C. 40))
 The Education (School Teachers’ Pay and Conditions) (No. 2) Order 1998 (S.I. 1998 No. 1884)
 The Education (National Curriculum) (Attainment Targets and Programmes of Study in Geography) (Wales) Order 1998 (S.I. 1998 No. 1885)
 The Education (National Curriculum) (Attainment Targets and Programmes of Study in Art) (Wales) Order 1998 (S.I. 1998 No. 1886)
 The Education (National Curriculum) (Attainment Targets and Programmes of Study in Physical Education) (Wales) Order 1998 (S.I. 1998 No. 1887)
 The Education (National Curriculum) (Attainment Targets and Programmes of Study in History) (Wales) Order 1998 (S.I. 1998 No. 1888)
 The Education (National Curriculum) (Attainment Targets and Programmes of Study in Music) (Wales) Order 1998 (S.I. 1998 No. 1889)
 The Education (National Curriculum) (Attainment Targets and Programmes of Study in Technology) (Wales) Order 1998 (S.I. 1998 No. 1890)
 The Income Tax (Employments) (Notional Payments) (Amendment) Regulations 1998 (S.I. 1998 No. 1891)
 The Special Immigration Appeals Commission Act 1997 (Commencement No. 2) Order 1998 (S.I. 1998 No. 1892 (C. 41)])
 The Rules of the Supreme Court (Amendment) 1998 (S.I. 1998 No. 1898 (L.2)])
 The County Court (Amendment) Rules 1998 (S.I. 1998 No. 1899 (L.3)])
 The County Courts (Forms) (Amendment) Rules 1998 (S.I. 1998 No. 1900 (L.4))

1901-2000

 The Family Proceedings (Amendment) Rules 1998 (S.I. 1998 No. 1901 (L.5)])
 The Protection from Harassment Act 1997 (Commencement No. 3) Order 1998 (S.I. 1998 No. 1902 (C.42)])
 The Non-Contentious Probate (Amendment) Rules 1998 (S.I. 1998 No. 1903 (L.6)])
 The Parole Board (Scotland) Amendment Rules 1998 (S.I. 1998 No. 1904 (S.100)])
 The Dartford-Thurrock Crossing Tolls Order 1998 (S.I. 1998 No. 1907)
 The Dartford-Thurrock Crossing Regulations 1998 (S.I. 1998 No. 1908)
 The Social Fund Winter Fuel Payment Amendment Regulations 1998 (S.I. 1998 No. 1910)
 The Merchant Shipping (Registration of Ships) (Tonnage Amendment) Regulations 1998 (S.I. 1998 No. 1915)
 The Merchant Shipping (Tonnage) (Fishing Vessels) (Amendment) Regulations 1998 (S.I. 1998 No. 1916)
 The Deregulation (Exchangeable Driving Licences) Order 1998 (S.I. 1998 No. 1917)
 The Local Government (Committees and Political Groups) (Amendment) Regulations 1998 (S.I. 1998 No. 1918)
 The A406 Trunk Road (Hanger Lane, Ealing) Red Route (Prohibited Turns) Traffic Order 1998 (S.I. 1998 No. 1919)
 The Secure Training Order (Transitory Provisions) Order 1998 (S.I. 1998 No. 1928)
 The Education (School Performance Information) (England) Regulations 1998 (S.I. 1998 No. 1929)
 The Greater Manchester (Light Rapid Transit System) (Ashton-under-Lyne Extension) Order 1998 (S.I. 1998 No. 1936)
 The Local Authorities (Capital Finance) (Amendment No. 3) Regulations 1998 (S.I. 1998 No. 1937)
 The Scottish Legal Aid Board (Employment of Solicitors to Provide Criminal Legal Assistance) Regulations 1998 (S.I. 1998 No. 1938 (S.101)])
 The Firearms Rules 1998 (S.I. 1998 No. 1941)
 The Education (Plans for Reducing Infant Class Sizes) (Wales) Regulations 1998 (S.I. 1998 No. 1942)
 The Education (Infant Class Sizes) (Wales) Regulations 1998 (S.I. 1998 No. 1943)
 The Consumer Credit (Exempt Agreements) (Amendment) Order 1998 (S.I. 1998 No. 1944)
 The Foreign Package Holidays (Tour Operators and Travel Agents) Order 1998 (S.I. 1998 No. 1945)
 The Deregulation (Taxis and Private Hire Vehicles) Order 1998 (S.I. 1998 No. 1946)
 The Education (Infant Class Sizes) (Transitional Provisions) Regulations 1998 (S.I. 1998 No. 1947)
 The Education Act 1996 (Infant Class Sizes) (Modification) Regulations 1998 (S.I. 1998 No. 1948)
 The A41 Trunk Road (Camden) (Temporary Prohibition of Traffic) (No. 3) Order 1998 (S.I. 1998 No. 1949)
 The A41 Trunk Road (Camden) (Temporary Prohibition of Traffic) (No. 4) Order 1998 (S.I. 1998 No. 1950)
 The A4 Trunk Road (Hammersmith & Fulham and Kensington & Chelsea) Red Route Experimental Traffic Order 1997 Variation Order 1998 (S.I. 1998 No. 1951)
 The Barnsley Education Action Zone Order 1998 (S.I. 1998 No. 1952)
 The Blackburn and Darwen Education Action Zone Order 1998 (S.I. 1998 No. 1953)
 The CfBT/Lambeth Education Action Zone Order 1998 (S.I. 1998 No. 1954)
 The Herefordshire Education Action Zone Order 1998 (S.I. 1998 No. 1955)
 The Leicester (South and West) Education Action Zone Order 1998 (S.I. 1998 No. 1956)
 The East Middlesbrough Education Action Zone Order 1998 (S.I. 1998 No. 1957)
 The Newcastle Education Action Zone Order 1998 (S.I. 1998 No. 1958)
 The New Addington Education Action Zone Order 1998 (S.I. 1998 No. 1959)
 The Newham Education Action Zone Order 1998 (S.I. 1998 No. 1960)
 The Next Step North East Lincolnshire Education Action Zone Order 1998 (S.I. 1998 No. 1961)
 The Salford & Trafford Education Action Zone Order 1998 (S.I. 1998 No. 1962)
 The N. Somerset Education Action Zone Order 1998 (S.I. 1998 No. 1963)
 The Education Action Forum (Proceedings) Regulations 1998 (S.I. 1998 No. 1964)
 The Education (Fees and Awards) (Amendment) Regulations 1998 (S.I. 1998 No. 1965)
 The Education (Assisted Places) (Amendment) (No. 2) Regulations 1998 (S.I. 1998 No. 1966)
 The Assured and Protected Tenancies (Lettings to Students) Regulations 1998 (S.I. 1998 No. 1967)
 The School Standards and Framework Act 1998 (Infant Class Sizes) (Modification) Regulations 1998 (S.I. 1998 No. 1968)
 The Education (Allocation of Grant-maintained and Grant-maintained Special Schools to New Categories) Regulations 1998 (S.I. 1998 No. 1969)
 The Education (Prescribed Courses of Higher Education) (Wales) (Amendment) Regulations 1998 (S.I. 1998 No. 1970)
 The Education (Plans for Reducing Infant Class Sizes) (England) Regulations 1998 (S.I. 1998 No. 1971)
 The Education (Mandatory Awards) Regulations 1998 (Amendment) Regulations 1998 (S.I. 1998 No. 1972)
 The Education (Infant Class Sizes) (England) Regulations 1998 (S.I. 1998 No. 1973)
 The Animals (Scientific Procedures) Act 1986 (Amendment) Regulations 1998 (S.I. 1998 No. 1974)
 The National Health Service Trusts (Membership and Procedure) Amendment Regulations 1998 (S.I. 1998 No. 1975)
 The Education (National Curriculum) (Key Stage 3 Assessment Arrangements) (Wales) (Amendment) Order 1998 (S.I. 1998 No. 1976)
 The Education (National Curriculum) (Assessment Arrangements for English, Welsh, Mathematics and Science) (Key Stage 2) (Wales) (Amendment) Order 1998 (S.I. 1998 No. 1977)
 The Education (National Curriculum) (Attainment Targets and Programmes of Study in Technology) (England) Order 1998 (S.I. 1998 No. 1986)
 The Education (National Curriculum) (Attainment Targets and Programmes of Study in Physical Education) (England) Order 1998 (S.I. 1998 No. 1987)
 The Education (National Curriculum) (Attainment Targets and Programmes of Study in History) (England) Order 1998 (S.I. 1998 No. 1988)
 The Education (National Curriculum) (Attainment Targets and Programmes of Study in Geography) (England) Order 1998 (S.I. 1998 No. 1989)
 The Education (National Curriculum) (Attainment Targets and Programmes of Study in Art) (England) Order 1998 (S.I. 1998 No. 1990)
 The Education (National Curriculum) (Attainment Targets and Programmes of Study in Music) (England) Order 1998 (S.I. 1998 No. 1991)
 The Harrow and Hillingdon Healthcare National Health Service Trust (Establishment) Amendment Order 1998 (S.I. 1998 No. 1992)
 Act of Sederunt (Child Care and Maintenance Rules) (Amendment) 1998 (S.I. 1998 No. 1993 (S.102)])
 The Education (Assisted Places) (Scotland) Amendment (No.2) Regulations 1998 (S.I. 1998 No. 1994 (S.103)])
 The National Health Service (Primary Care) Act 1997 (Commencement No. 5) Order 1998 (S.I. 1998 No. 1998 (C.43))

2001-2100

 The Education (Student Support) Regulations 1998 (S.I. 1998 No. 2003)
 The Teaching and Higher Education Act 1998 (Commencement No. 2 and Transitional Provisions) Order 1998 (S.I. 1998 No. 2004)
 The Education (Student Loans) (Amendment No. 2) Regulations 1998 (S.I. 1998 No. 2005)
 The Community Drivers' Hours and Recording Equipment (Amendment) Regulations 1998 (S.I. 1998 No. 2006)
 The Housing (Right To Acquire) (Discount) Order 1998 (S.I. 1998 No. 2014)
 The Housing (Right to Buy) (Priority of Charges) (No. 2) Order 1998 (S.I. 1998 No. 2015)
 The Road Traffic Act 1991 (Amendment of Schedule 3) (Scotland) Order 1998 (S.I. 1998 No. 2018 (S. 104)])
 The Removal and Disposal of Vehicles (Amendment) Regulations 1998 (S.I. 1998 No. 2019 (S. 105)])
 The Parking Attendants (Wearing of Uniforms) (Edinburgh Parking Area) Regulations 1998 (S.I. 1998 No. 2020 (S. 106)])
 The Education (National Curriculum) (Exceptions at Key Stage 4) Regulations 1998 (S.I. 1998 No. 2021)
 The Fertilisers (Amendment) Regulations 1998 (S.I. 1998 No. 2024)
 The Agricultural Holdings (Units of Production) Order 1998 (S.I. 1998 No. 2025)
 The Education (Student Loans) (Scotland) Regulations 1998 (S.I. 1998 No. 2026 (S. 107)])
 The Chiropractors Act 1994 (Commencement No. 1 and Transitional Provision) Order 1998 (S.I. 1998 No. 2031 (C.44)])
 The Outer Space Act 1986 (Fees) (Amendment) Regulations 1998 (S.I. 1998 No. 2032)
 The Cardiff Community Healthcare National Health Service Trust (Establishment) Amendment Order 1998 (S.I. 1998 No. 2033)
 The East Glamorgan National Health Service Trust (Establishment) Amendment Order 1998 (S.I. 1998 No. 2034)
 The A41 Trunk Road (Westminster) Red Route Traffic Order 1998 Variation Order 1998 (S.I. 1998 No. 2035)
 The Motor Vehicles (Driving Licences) (Amendment) (No. 4) Regulations 1998 (S.I. 1998 No. 2038)
 The Food Protection (Emergency Prohibitions) (Paralytic Shellfish Poisoning) Order 1998 Partial Revocation (No.2) Order 1998 (S.I. 1998 No. 2045)
 The Local Government Act 1988 (Defined Activities) (Exemptions) (Castle Morpeth Borough Council and West Somerset and Uttlesford District Councils) Order 1998 (S.I. 1998 No. 2047)
 The School Standards and Framework Act 1998 (Commencement No. 1) Order 1998 (S.I. 1998 No. 2048 (C.45)])
 The Local Government Act 1988 (Defined Activities) (Exemptions) (Chiltern District Council, Lewes District Council and Eastbourne Borough Council) Order 1998 (S.I. 1998 No. 2049)
 The Local Government Act 1988 (Defined Activities) (Exemption) (Derwentside and Wyre Forest District Councils) Order 1998 (S.I. 1998 No. 2050)
 The Motor Vehicles (EC Type Approval) Regulations 1998 (S.I. 1998 No. 2051)
 The Gaming Duty (Amendment) Regulations 1998 (S.I. 1998 No. 2055)
 The Merchant Shipping (Radio Installations) Regulations 1998 (S.I. 1998 No. 2070)
 The Combined Probation Areas (Lancashire) Order 1998 (S.I. 1998 No. 2071)
 The Feeding Stuffs (Amendment) (No. 2) Regulations 1998 (S.I. 1998 No. 2072)
 The Brucellosis and Tuberculosis (England and Wales) Compensation (Amendment) Order 1998 (S.I. 1998 No. 2073)
 The Cod (Specified Sea Areas) (Prohibition of Fishing) (Revocation) Order 1998 (S.I. 1998 No. 2074)
 The Sole (Specified Sea Area) (Prohibition of Fishing) Order 1998 (S.I. 1998 No. 2075)
 The Prescription Only Medicines (Human Use) Amendment (No. 3) Order 1998 (S.I. 1998 No. 2081)
 The Housing (Change of Landlord) (Payment of Disposal Cost by Instalments) (Amendment) (No. 2) Regulations 1998 (S.I. 1998 No. 2082)
 The School Standards and Framework Act 1998 (Appointed Day) Order 1998 (S.I. 1998 No. 2083 (c. 48)])
 The Newcastle Education Action Zone (No. 2) Order 1998 (S.I. 1998 No. 2084)
 The Blackburn with Darwen Education Action Zone Order 1998 (S.I. 1998 No. 2085)
 The Meat (Hygiene and Inspection) (Charges) Regulations 1998 (S.I. 1998 No. 2095)

2101-2200

 The School Standards and Framework Act 1998 (School Teachers' Pay and Conditions) (Transitional Provisions) Regulations 1998 (S.I. 1998 No. 2115)
 The Mid Essex Hospital Services National Health Service Trust (Establishment) Amendment Order 1998 (S.I. 1998 No. 2116)
 The Social Security Amendment (New Deal) (No.2) Regulations 1998 (S.I. 1998 No. 2117)
 The Local Government Pension Scheme (Transitional Provisions etc.) (Amendment) Regulations 1998 (S.I. 1998 No. 2118)
 The Food Protection (Emergency Prohibitions) (Paralytic Shellfish Poisoning) Order 1998 Partial Revocation (No.3) Order 1998 (S.I. 1998 No. 2119)
 The Education (Funding for Teacher Training) Designation (No. 2) Order 1998 (S.I. 1998 No. 2120)
 The Llandeilo–Carmarthen Trunk Road (A40) (Pont-ar-Gothi By-Pass) (Revocation) Order 1998 (S.I. 1998 No. 2121)
 The Prevention of Water Pollution (Greenside, Jaw, Cochno, Burncrooks, Kilmannan, Black Linn, Greenland 1, 2 & 3, Garshake, Fin and Loch Humphrey) (Extension of Period of Byelaws) Order 1998 (S.I. 1998 No. 2127 (S. 108)])
 Act of Sederunt (Child Care and Maintenance Rules) (Amendment No.2) 1998 (S.I. 1998 No. 2130 (S. 109)])
 The River Esk Salmon Fishery District (Baits and Lures) Regulations 1998 (S.I. 1998 No. 2131 (S. 110)])
 The Nitrate Sensitive Areas (Amendment) (No. 2) Regulations 1998 (S.I. 1998 No. 2138)
 The Public Telecommunication System Designation (National Band Three Limited) Order 1998 (S.I. 1998 No. 2139)
 The Public Telecommunication System Designation (Tetralink Telecommunications Limited) Order 1998 (S.I. 1998 No. 2140)
 The Public Telecommunication System Designation (TeleDanmark A/S) Order 1998 (S.I. 1998 No. 2141)
 The Public Telecommunication System Designation (PSI Net Telecom UK Limited) Order 1998 (S.I. 1998 No. 2142)
 The Public Telecommunication System Designation (DirectNet Telecommunications UK Limited) Order 1998 (S.I. 1998 No. 2143)
 The Public Telecommunication System Designation (Singtel (Europe) Limited) Order 1998 (S.I. 1998 No. 2144)
 The Public Telecommunication System Designation (Startec Telecom Limited) Order 1998 (S.I. 1998 No. 2145)
 The Public Telecommunication System Designation(o.tel.o communications Limited) Order 1998 (S.I. 1998 No. 2146)
 The Public Telecommunication System Designation (Stentor Communications Limited) Order 1998 (S.I. 1998 No. 2147)
 The Public Telecommunication System Designation (Transline Communications Limited) Order 1998 (S.I. 1998 No. 2148)
 The Public Telecommunication System Designation (GN Great Northern Gateway Ltd. A/S) Order 1998 (S.I. 1998 No. 2149)
 The Gaming Machines (Maximum Prizes)Regulations 1998 (S.I. 1998 No. 2150)
 The Gaming Clubs (Multiple Bingo) (Amendment) Regulations 1998 (S.I. 1998 No. 2151)
 The Gaming Act (Variation of Monetary Limits) (No. 2) Order 1998 (S.I. 1998 No. 2152)
 The Gaming (Bingo) Act (Variation of Monetary Limit) Order 1998 (S.I. 1998 No. 2153)
 The Smoke Control Areas (Authorised Fuels) (Amendment) Regulations 1998 (S.I. 1998 No. 2154)
 The District of Purbeck (Electoral Changes) Order 1998 (S.I. 1998 No. 2159)
 The Housing Benefit and Council Tax Benefit Amendment (New Deal) Regulations 1998 (S.I. 1998 No. 2164)
 The Magistrates' Courts (Grants) Regulations 1998 (S.I. 1998 No. 2165)
 The Children (Allocation of Proceedings) (Amendment) Order 1998 (S.I. 1998 No. 2166)
 The Magistrates' Courts (Miscellaneous Amendments) Rules 1998 (S.I. 1998 No. 2167 (L.7)])
 The Crown Court (Amendment) Rules 1998 (S.I. 1998 No. 2168 (L.8)])
 The Investor Compensation Scheme Regulations 1998 (S.I. 1998 No. 2169)
 The Medicines (Products Other Than Veterinary Drugs) (General Sale List) Amendment Order 1998 (S.I. 1998 No. 2170)
 The A205 Trunk Road (Lewisham) Red Route (Bus Lanes) Experimental Traffic Order 1998 (S.I. 1998 No. 2171)
 The Environmentally Sensitive Areas (Avon Valley) Designation (Amendment) (No. 2) Order 1998 (S.I. 1998 No. 2172)
 The Environmentally Sensitive Areas (North Peak) Designation (Amendment) (No. 2) Order 1998 (S.I. 1998 No. 2173)
 The Environmentally Sensitive Areas (Exmoor) Designation (Amendment) (No. 2) Order 1998 (S.I. 1998 No. 2174)
 The Environmentally Sensitive Areas (South Wessex Downs) Designation (Amendment) (No. 2) Order 1998 (S.I. 1998 No. 2175)
 The Environmentally Sensitive Areas (North Kent Marshes) Designation (Amendment) (No. 2) Order 1998 (S.I. 1998 No. 2176)
 The Environmentally Sensitive Areas (Lake District) Designation (Amendment) (No. 2) Order 1998 (S.I. 1998 No. 2177)
 The Environmentally Sensitive Areas (Test Valley) Designation (Amendment) (No. 2) Order 1998 (S.I. 1998 No. 2178)
 The Brucellosis and Tuberculosis (Scotland) Compensation Amendment Order 1998 (S.I. 1998 No. 2181 (S.111)])
 The A10 Trunk Road (Haringey) Red Route Experimental Traffic Order 1998 (S.I. 1998 No. 2184)
 The Local Government Act 1988 (Defined Activities) (Exemptions) (Wales) (Amendment) Order 1998 (S.I. 1998 No. 2188)
 The Local Government Act 1988 (Defined Activities) (Housing Management) (Exemptions) (Wales) (Amendment) Order 1998 (S.I. 1998 No. 2189)
 The Local Government Act 1988 (Direct Service Organisations) (Accounts etc.) (Extension) (Wales) (Amendment) Order 1998 (S.I. 1998 No. 2190)
 The Local Government Act 1988 (Defined Activities) (Works Contracts) (Exemptions) (Wales) (Amendment) Order 1998 (S.I. 1998 No. 2191)
 The Local Government Act 1988 (Competition) (Wales) Regulations 1998 (S.I. 1998 No. 2192)
 The Local Authorities (Direct Labour Organisations) (Competition) (Wales) (Amendment) Regulations 1998 (S.I. 1998 No. 2193)
 The Land Authority for Wales (Transfer of Staff) Order 1998 (S.I. 1998 No. 2194)
 The Development Board for Rural Wales (Transfer of Staff) Order 1998 (S.I. 1998 No. 2195)
 The Education (School Performance Targets) (Wales) Regulations 1998 (S.I. 1998 No. 2196)
 The Service Subsidy Agreements (Tendering) (Amendment) Regulations 1998 (S.I. 1998 No. 2197)
 The Merchant Shipping (Port State Control) (Amendment No. 2) Regulations 1998 (S.I. 1998 No. 2198)

2201-2300

 The Plant Health (Forestry) (Great Britain) (Amendment) Order 1998 (S.I. 1998 No. 2206)
 The Amusement Machine Licence Duty (Small-prize Machines) Order 1998 (S.I. 1998 No. 2207)
 The Scottish College of Textiles (Closure) (Scotland) Order 1998 (S.I. 1998 No. 2208 (S.112)])
 The Social Security Act 1998 (Commencement No. 1) Order 1998 (S.I. 1998 No. 2209 (C.47)])
 The Wireless Telegraphy (Licence Charges) (Channel Islands and Isle of Man) Regulations 1998 (S.I. 1998 No. 2210)
 The Social Security (Contributions) Amendment (No. 3) Regulations 1998 (S.I. 1998 No. 2211)
 The School Standards and Framework Act 1998 (Commencement No. 2 and Supplemental, Saving and Transitional Provisions) Order 1998 (S.I. 1998 No. 2212 (C. 49)])
 The Combined Fire Authorities (Secure Tenancies) (England) Regulations 1998 (S.I. 1998 No. 2213)
 The Combined Fire Authorities (Secure Tenancies) (Wales) Regulations 1998 (S.I. 1998 No. 2214)
 The Teaching and Higher Education Act 1998 (Commencement No. 3) Order 1998 (S.I. 1998 No. 2215 (C. 50)])
 The National Health Service Pension Scheme Amendment (No. 2) Regulations 1998 (S.I. 1998 No. 2216)
 The National Health Service (Injury Benefits) Amendment (No. 2) Regulations 1998 (S.I. 1998 No. 2217)
 The Measuring Equipment (Liquid Fuel and Lubricants) (Amendment) Regulations 1998 (S.I. 1998 No. 2218)
 The Education (Grammar School Designation) Order 1998 (S.I. 1998 No. 2219)
 The Education (Further Education Institutions Information) (England) (Amendment) Regulations 1998 (S.I. 1998 No. 2220)
 The National Health Service (Dental Charges) Amendment Regulations 1998 (S.I. 1998 No. 2221)
 The National Health Service (Choice of Dental Practitioner) Regulations 1998 (S.I. 1998 No. 2222)
 The Dental Practice Boards (Personal Dental Services) Regulations 1998 (S.I. 1998 No. 2223)
 The National Health Service (Pilot Schemes for Personal Dental Services: Miscellaneous Provisions and Consequential Amendments) Regulations 1998 (S.I. 1998 No. 2224)
 The Transport and Works (Assessment of Environmental Effects) Regulations 1998 (S.I. 1998 No. 2226)
 The Environment Agency (Transfer of Functions of the Swavesey Internal Drainage Board) Order 1998 (S.I. 1998 No. 2227)
 The Axmouth Harbour Revision Order 1998 (S.I. 1998 No. 2228)
 The Education (Proportion of Selective Admissions) Regulations 1998 (S.I. 1998 No. 2229)
 The School Standards and Framework Act 1998 (Admissions) (Modifications) Regulations 1998 (S.I. 1998 No. 2230)
 The Social Security (Welfare to Work) Regulations 1998 (S.I. 1998 No. 2231)
 The Environmentally Sensitive Areas (West Penwith) Designation (Amendment) (No. 2) Order 1998 (S.I. 1998 No. 2232)
 The Road Traffic (Parking Adjudicators) (City of Edinburgh) Regulations 1998 (S.I. 1998 No. 2233 (S.113)])
 The Dissolution of the Cable Authority Order 1998 (S.I. 1998 No. 2237)
 The Merchant Shipping (Load Line) Regulations 1998 (S.I. 1998 No. 2241)
 The A23 Trunk Road (Croydon) Red Route (Prohibited Turns) (No. 3) Experimental Traffic Order 1998 (S.I. 1998 No. 2242)
 The Finance Act 1998, Schedule 2, (Appointed Day) Order 1998 (S.I. 1998 No. 2243 (C. 51)])
 The Government of Wales Act 1998 (Commencement No. 1) Order 1998 (S.I. 1998 No. 2244 (C.52)])
 The Plant Health (Great Britain) (Amendment) (No. 3) Order 1998 (S.I. 1998 No. 2245)
 The Disposal of Waste (Control of Beet Rhizomania Disease) (Revocation) Order 1998 (S.I. 1998 No. 2246)
 The Motor Cars (Driving Instruction) (Amendment) Regulations 1998 (S.I. 1998 No. 2247)
 The School Standards and Framework Act 1998 (Intervention in Schools Causing Concern) (Modification) Regulations 1998 (S.I. 1998 No. 2248)
 The Motor Vehicles (Authorisation of Special Types) (Amendment) Order 1998 (S.I. 1998 No. 2249)
 The Social Security Amendment (Capital) Regulations 1998 (S.I. 1998 No. 2250)
 The High Court of Justiciary (Proceedings in the Netherlands) (United Nations) Order 1998 (S.I. 1998 No. 2251)
 The Royal College of Ophthalmologists (Charter Amendment) Order 1998 (S.I. 1998 No. 2252)
 The Monopoly References (Deletion of Exclusions) Order 1998 (S.I. 1998 No. 2253)
 The Road Works (Registers, Notices, Directions and Designations) (Scotland) Amendment Regulations 1998 (S.I. 1998 No. 2254 (S.114)])
 The Teachers' Pensions (Amendment) Regulations 1998 (S.I. 1998 No. 2255)
 The Teachers (Compensation for Redundancy and Premature Retirement) (Amendment) Regulations 1998 (S.I. 1998 No. 2256)
 The Extraction Solvents in Food (Amendment) Regulations 1998 (S.I. 1998 No. 2257)
 The National Health Service (Dental Charges) (Scotland) Amendment (No. 2) Regulations 1998 (S.I. 1998 No. 2258 (S.115)])
 The National Health Service (Choice of Dental Practitioner) (Scotland) Regulations 1998 (S.I. 1998 No. 2259 (S.116)])
 The Local Government Act 1988 (Defined Activities) (Exemption) (East Lindsey and Suffolk Coastal District Councils) Order 1998 (S.I. 1998 No. 2275)
 The Yugoslavia (Prohibition of Flights) Regulations 1998 (S.I. 1998 No. 2284)
 The Registration of Births, Still-Births, Deaths and Marriages (Prescription of Forms) (Scotland) Amendment Regulations 1998 (S.I. 1998 No. 2285 (S. 117))

2301-2400

 The Provision and Use of Work Equipment Regulations 1998 (S.I. 1998 No. 2306)
 The Lifting Operations and Lifting Equipment Regulations 1998 (S.I. 1998 No. 2307)
 The Stockport Healthcare National Health Service Trust (Establishment) Amendment Order 1998 (S.I. 1998 No. 2310)
 The Town and Country Planning (Inquiries Procedure) (Scotland) Amendment Rules 1998 (S.I. 1998 No. 2311 (S.118)])
 The Town and Country Planning Appeals (Determination by Appointed Person) (Inquiries Procedure) (Scotland) Amendment Rules 1998 (S.I. 1998 No. 2312 (S.119)])
 The Compulsory Purchase by Public Authorities (Inquiries Procedure) (Scotland) Rules 1998 (S.I. 1998 No. 2313 (S.120)])
 The Sports Grounds and Sporting Events (Designation) (Scotland) Order 1998 (S.I. 1998 No. 2314 (S.121)])
 The Social Security (Contributions) Amendment (No. 4) Regulations 1998 (S.I. 1998 No. 2320)
 The Education (Fees and Awards) (Scotland) Amendment Regulations 1998 (S.I. 1998 No. 2324 (S.122)])
 The Crime and Disorder Act 1998 (Commencement No. 2 and Transitional Provisions) Order 1998 (S.I. 1998 No. 2327 (C. 53)])
 The Friendly Societies (Activities of a Subsidiary) Order 1998 (S.I. 1998 No. 2328)
 The Local Government and Rating Act 1997 (Commencement No. 5 and Transitional Provision) Order 1998 (S.I. 1998 No. 2329 (C. 54)])
 The Building (Approved Inspectors etc.) (Amendment) Regulations 1998 (S.I. 1998 No. 2332)
 The Borough of Boston (Electoral Changes) Order 1998 (S.I. 1998 No. 2333)
 The City of Lincoln (Electoral Changes) Order 1998 (S.I. 1998 No. 2334)
 The District of East Lindsey (Electoral Changes) Order 1998 (S.I. 1998 No. 2335)
 The District of South Holland (Electoral Changes) Order 1998 (S.I. 1998 No. 2336)
 The District of South Kesteven (Electoral Changes) Order 1998 (S.I. 1998 No. 2337)
 The District of North Kesteven (Parishes and Electoral Changes) Order 1998 (S.I. 1998 No. 2338)
 The District of Wansbeck (Electoral Changes) Order 1998 (S.I. 1998 No. 2342)
 The District of Tynedale (Electoral Changes) Order 1998 (S.I. 1998 No. 2343)
 The Borough of Castle Morpeth (Electoral Changes) Order 1998 (S.I. 1998 No. 2344)
 The Borough of Blyth Valley (Electoral Changes) Order 1998 (S.I. 1998 No. 2345)
 The Borough of Berwick-upon-Tweed (Electoral Changes) Order 1998 (S.I. 1998 No. 2346)
 The District of Alnwick (Electoral Changes) Order 1998 (S.I. 1998 No. 2347)
 The Electricity (Non-Fossil Fuel Sources) (England and Wales) Order 1998 (S.I. 1998 No. 2353)
 The District of West Lindsey (Electoral Changes) Order 1998 (S.I. 1998 No. 2366)
 The Horse Passports (Amendment) Order 1998 (S.I. 1998 No. 2367)
 The Medicines (Pharmacy and General Sale—Exemption) Amendment (No. 2) Order 1998 (S.I. 1998 No. 2368)
 The Bank of England Act 1998 (Transfer Scheme Appointed Day) Order 1998 (S.I. 1998 No. 2372)
 The Railways (Ashford) (Exemptions) Order 1998 (S.I. 1998 No. 2379)
 The National Health Service Act 1977 and National Health Service (Scotland) Act 1978 Amendment Order 1998 (S.I. 1998 No. 2385)
 The Water Undertakers (Extension of Byelaws) Order 1998 (S.I. 1998 No. 2398)
 The Severn Trent Water Limited (Extension of Byelaws) Order 1998 (S.I. 1998 No. 2399)
 The County Courts (Interest on Judgment Debts) (Amendment) Order 1998 (S.I. 1998 No. 2400 (L.9))

2401-2500

 The Legal Aid in Criminal and Care Proceedings (Costs) (Amendment) (No. 2) Regulations 1998 (S.I. 1998 No. 2401)
 The Reservoirs (Panels of Civil Engineers) (Applications and Fees) (Amendment) Regulations 1998 (S.I. 1998 No. 2403)
 The Specified Risk Material (Amendment) Regulations 1998 (S.I. 1998 No. 2405)
 The Pencils and Graphic Instruments (Safety) Regulations 1998 (S.I. 1998 No. 2406)
 The M41 West Cross Route (Holland Park Roundabout to A40(M)/M41 Junction Trunk Road) Order 1998 (S.I. 1998 No. 2407)
 The Prohibition of Keeping or Release of Live Fish (Specified Species) Order 1998 (S.I. 1998 No. 2409)
 The Olive Oil (Marketing Standards) (Amendment) Regulations 1998 (S.I. 1998 No. 2410)
 The Merchant Shipping and Fishing Vessels (Health and Safety at Work) (Employment of Young Persons) Regulations 1998 (S.I. 1998 No. 2411)
 The Crime and Disorder Act 1998 (Commencement No. 2 and Transitional Provisions) (Amendment) Order 1998 (S.I. 1998 No. 2412 (C. 55)])
 The National Health Service (Travelling Expenses and Remission of Charges) Amendment Regulations 1998 (S.I. 1998 No. 2417)
 The Drinking Milk Regulations 1998 (S.I. 1998 No. 2424)
 The A13 Trunk Road (Newham) (Temporary Prohibition of Traffic) Order 1998 (S.I. 1998 No. 2426)
 The A205 Trunk Road (Lewisham) Red Route (Prohibited Turns) Experimental Traffic Order 1998 (S.I. 1998 No. 2427)
 The Medicines (Products for Animal Use—Fees) Regulations 1998 (S.I. 1998 No. 2428)
 The Road Vehicles (Construction and Use) (Amendment) (No. 6) Regulations 1998 (S.I. 1998 No. 2429)
 The Specified Risk Material (Coming into Force Date) (Amendment) Regulations 1998 (S.I. 1998 No. 2431)
 The East Middlesbrough Education Action Zone (No. 2) Order 1998 (S.I. 1998 No. 2450)
 The Gas Safety (Installation and Use) Regulations 1998 (S.I. 1998 No. 2451)
 The Crime and Disorder Strategies (Prescribed Descriptions) Order 1998 (S.I. 1998 No. 2452)
 The Housing Benefit (Recovery of Overpayments) Amendment Regulations 1998 (S.I. 1998 No. 2454)
 The Social Fund Cold Weather Payments (General) Amendment Regulations 1998 (S.I. 1998 No. 2455)
 The Rail Vehicle Accessibility Regulations 1998 (S.I. 1998 No. 2456)
 The Rail Vehicle (Exemption Applications) Regulations 1998 (S.I. 1998 No. 2457)
 The School Standards and Framework Act 1998 (Commencement No. 2 and Supplemental, Saving and Transitional Provisions) (Amendment) Order 1998 (S.I. 1998 No. 2459 (C.58)])
 The Cornwall and Isles of Scilly Health Authority (Transfers of Trust Property) Order 1998 (S.I. 1998 No. 2460)
 The Borough of Taunton Deane (Electoral Changes) Order 1998 (S.I. 1998 No. 2461)
 The District of South Somerset (Electoral Changes)Order 1998 (S.I. 1998 No. 2462)
 The District of West Somerset (Electoral Changes) Order 1998 (S.I. 1998 No. 2463)
 The District of Mendip (Electoral Changes) Order 1998 (S.I. 1998 No. 2464)
 The District of Sedgemoor (Electoral Changes) Order 1998 (S.I. 1998 No. 2465)
 The Local Government Act 1988 (Defined Activities) (Exemptions) (No. 3) Order 1998 (S.I. 1998 No. 2477)
 The Leeds Community and Mental Health Services Teaching National Health Service Trust (Establishment) Amendment (No. 2) Order 1998 (S.I. 1998 No. 2478)
 The Late Payment of Commercial Debts (Interest) Act 1998 (Commencement No. 1) Order 1998 (S.I. 1998 No. 2479 (C. 56)])
 The Late Payment of Commercial Debts (Rate of Interest) Order 1998 (S.I. 1998 No. 2480)
 The Late Payment of Commercial Debts (Interest) Act 1998 (Transitional Provisions) Regulations 1998 (S.I. 1998 No. 2481)
 The Late Payment of Commercial Debts (Interest) (Legal Aid Exceptions) Order 1998 (S.I. 1998 No. 2482)
 The Immigration (Transit Visa) (Amendment No. 3)Order 1998 (S.I. 1998 No. 2483)
 The Income Tax (Employments) (Amendment) Regulations 1998 (S.I. 1998 No. 2484)
 The East Yorkshire Hospitals National Health Service Trust (Establishment) Amendment Order 1998 (S.I. 1998 No. 2485)
 The Bromley Hospitals National Health Service Trust (Establishment) Amendment (No. 2) Order 1998 (S.I. 1998 No. 2486)
 The District of South Hams (Electoral Changes) Order 1998 (S.I. 1998 No. 2487)
 The Water Undertakers (Extension of Byelaws) (No. 2) Order 1998 (S.I. 1998 No. 2489)
 Welsh Development Agency (Membership) Order 1998 (S.I. 1998 No. 2490)

2501-2600

 The London Borough of Lewisham (Trunk Roads) Red Route (Bus Lanes) Traffic Order 1998 (S.I. 1998 No. 2502)
 The Prisons and Young Offenders Institutions (Scotland) Amendment (No.2) Rules 1998 (S.I. 1998 No. 2504 (S.123)])
 The Exchange of Securities (General) (Amendment) Rules 1998 (S.I. 1998 No. 2505)
 The Borough of Corby (Electoral Changes) Order 1998 (S.I. 1998 No. 2506)
 The District of Daventry (Electoral Changes) Order 1998 (S.I. 1998 No. 2507)
 The Borough of Kettering (Electoral Changes) Order 1998 (S.I. 1998 No. 2508)
 The District of South Northamptonshire (Electoral Changes) Order 1998 (S.I. 1998 No. 2509)
 The Borough of Wellingborough (Electoral Changes) Order 1998 (S.I. 1998 No. 2510)
 The Borough of Northampton (Electoral Changes) Order 1998 (S.I. 1998 No. 2511)
 The District of East Northamptonshire (Electoral Changes) Order 1998 (S.I. 1998 No. 2512)
 The Crime and Disorder Strategies (Prescribed Descriptions) (Amendment) Order 1998 (S.I. 1998 No. 2513)
 The Merchant Shipping (Passenger Ship Construction: Ships of Classes I, II and II(A)) Regulations 1998 (S.I. 1998 No. 2514)
 The Merchant Shipping (Passenger Ship Construction: Ships of Classes III to VI(A)) Regulations 1998 (S.I. 1998 No. 2515)
 The A417 Trunk Road (Daglingworth Quarry Junction) (Detrunking) Order 1998 (S.I. 1998 No. 2517)
 The A419 Trunk Road (Latton Bypass and Slip Roads) (Detrunking) Order 1998 (S.I. 1998 No. 2518)
 The European Parliamentary Elections (Day of By-election) (North East Scotland Constituency) Order 1998 (S.I. 1998 No. 2522)
 The Education (School Information) (England) Regulations 1998 (S.I. 1998 No. 2526)
 The Judicial Pensions (Transfer Between Judicial Pension Schemes) (Amendment) Regulations 1998 (S.I. 1998 No. 2527)
 The Wireless Telegraphy (Citizens' Band and Amateur Apparatus) (Various Provisions) Order 1998 (S.I. 1998 No. 2531)
 The Local Government etc. (Scotland) Act 1994 (Commencement No.8) Order 1998 (S.I. 1998 No. 2532 (C. 57) (S. 124)])
 The Trade Effluent (Registers) (Scotland) Regulations 1998 (S.I. 1998 No. 2533 (S. 125)])
 The Religious Character of Schools (Designation Procedure) Regulations 1998 (S.I. 1998 No. 2535)
 The Air Navigation (Dangerous Goods) (Third Amendment) Regulations 1998 (S.I. 1998 No. 2536)
 The Welfare of Animals (Staging Points) Order 1998 (S.I. 1998 No. 2537)
 The Spreadable Fats (Marketing Standards) (Amendment) (No. 2) Regulations 1998 (S.I. 1998 No. 2538)
 The A4 Trunk Road (Concorde Roundabout, Hillingdon) (Prohibitions On The Northern Carriageway) Order 1998 (S.I. 1998 No. 2539)
 The A4 Trunk Road (Hounslow) Red Route (Clearway) Traffic Order 1996 Variation (No. 2) Order 1998 (S.I. 1998 No. 2545)
 The District of Eden (Electoral Changes) Order 1998 (S.I. 1998 No. 2547)
 The District of South Lakeland (Electoral Changes) Order 1998 (S.I. 1998 No. 2548)
 The City of Carlisle (Electoral Changes) Order 1998 (S.I. 1998 No. 2549)
 The Local Government Act 1988 (Defined Activities) (Exemption) (Leicester City Council) Order 1998 (S.I. 1998 No. 2550)
 The Borough of Broxbourne (Electoral Changes) Order 1998 (S.I. 1998 No. 2551)
 The Borough of Dacorum (Electoral Changes) Order 1998 (S.I. 1998 No. 2552)
 The District of East Hertfordshire (Electoral Changes) Order 1998 (S.I. 1998 No. 2553)
 The Borough of Hertsmere (Electoral Changes) Order 1998 (S.I. 1998 No. 2554)
 The District of North Hertfordshire (Electoral Changes) Order 1998 (S.I. 1998 No. 2555)
 The District of Three Rivers (Parishes and Electoral Changes) Order 1998 (S.I. 1998 No. 2556)
 The Borough of Stevenage (Electoral Changes) Order 1998 (S.I. 1998 No. 2557)
 The City of St Albans (Electoral Changes) Order 1998 (S.I. 1998 No. 2558)
 The Borough of Watford (Electoral Changes) Order 1998 (S.I. 1998 No. 2559)
 The District of Welwyn Hatfield (Electoral Changes) Order 1998 (S.I. 1998 No. 2560)
 The Building Regulations (Amendment) Regulations 1998 (S.I. 1998 No. 2561)
 The Carriage by Air and Road Act 1979 (Commencement No. 3) Order 1998 (S.I. 1998 No. 2562 (C.59)])
 Outer Space Act 1986 (Cayman Islands) Order 1998 (S.I. 1998 No. 2563)
 The Territorial Sea (Amendment) Order 1998 (S.I. 1998 No. 2564)
 The Chemical Weapons Act 1996 (Jersey) Order 1998 (S.I. 1998 No. 2565)
 The Double Taxation Relief (Air Transport) (Hong Kong) Order 1998 (S.I. 1998 No. 2566)
 The Double Taxation Relief (Taxes on Income) (Kazakhstan) Order 1998 (S.I. 1998 No. 2567)
 The Double Taxation Relief (Taxes on Income) (Oman) Order 1998 (S.I. 1998 No. 2568)
 The Borough of Allerdale (Electoral Changes) Order 1998 (S.I. 1998 No. 2569)
 The Borough of Copeland (Electoral Changes) Order 1998 (S.I. 1998 No. 2570)
 The Borough of Barrow-in-Furness (Electoral Changes) Order 1998 (S.I. 1998 No. 2571)
 The Family Law Act 1996 (Commencement) (No. 3) Order 1998 (S.I. 1998 No. 2572 (C. 60)])
 The Employers' Liability (Compulsory Insurance) Regulations 1998 (S.I. 1998 No. 2573)
 The National Minimum Wage Act 1998 (Commencement No. 1 and Transitional Provisions) Order 1998 (S.I. 1998 No. 2574 (C.61)])
 The Civil Aviation (Canadian Navigation Services) Regulations 1998 (S.I. 1998 No. 2575)
 The Education (National Curriculum) (Attainment Targets and Programmes of Study in Welsh) (Amendment) Order 1998 (S.I. 1998 No. 2576)
 The A3 Trunk Road (Wandsworth High Street) (Bus Bay Clearway) Order 1998 (S.I. 1998 No. 2591)

2601-2700

 The A4 Trunk Road (Hillingdon) Red Route (Clearway) Traffic Order 1996 Variation Order 1998 (S.I. 1998 No. 2611)
 The A316 Trunk Road (Hounslow) Red Route Traffic Order 1998 (S.I. 1998 No. 2615)
 The Local Government Act 1988 (Defined Activities) (Exemption) (Rugby Borough Council) Order 1998 (S.I. 1998 No. 2616)
 The Disability Discrimination (Exemption for Small Employers) Order 1998 (S.I. 1998 No. 2618)
 The Local Government Act 1988 (Defined Activities) (Exemption) (Easington District Council) Order 1998 (S.I. 1998 No. 2619)
 The Finance Act 1995, Section 139(3), (Appointed Day) Order 1998 (S.I. 1998 No. 2620 (C. 62)])
 The Health Authorities (Membership and Procedure) Amendment Regulations 1998 (S.I. 1998 No. 2621)
 The Income Tax (Sub-contractors in the Construction Industry) (Amendment) Regulations 1998 (S.I. 1998 No. 2622)
 The Nurses, Midwives and Health Visitors (Miscellaneous Amendments) Order 1998 (S.I. 1998 No. 2623)
 The Mental Health (Hospital, Guardianship and Consent to Treatment) Amendment Regulations 1998 (S.I. 1998 No. 2624)
 The Mental Health (Nurses) Order 1998 (S.I. 1998 No. 2625)
 Act of Adjournal (Extension of Time Limit for Service of Transcript of Examination) 1998 (S.I. 1998 No. 2635 (S.126)])
 Act of Sederunt (Messengers-at-Arms and Sheriff Officers Rules) (Amendment) 1998 (S.I. 1998 No. 2636 (S.127)])
 Act of Sederunt (Rules of the Court of Session Amendment No. 2) (Miscellaneous) 1998 (S.I. 1998 No. 2637 (S. 128)])
 The Broadford Bay and Loch Ainort, Isle of Skye, Scallops Several Fishery Order 1998 (S.I. 1998 No. 2638 (S.129)])
 The Scalpay Island, Isle of Skye, Scallops Several Fishery Order 1998 (S.I. 1998 No. 2639 (S.130)])
 The Loch Sligachan, Isle of Skye, Scallops Several Fishery Order 1998 (S.I. 1998 No. 2640 (S.131)])
 The A19 Trunk Road (Wolviston Interchange, Southbound Exit Slip Road) (Trunking) Order 1998 (S.I. 1998 No. 2641)
 The Merchant Shipping (Carriage of Nautical Publications) Regulations 1998 (S.I. 1998 No. 2647)
 The Nurses, Midwives and Health Visitors (Midwives Amendment) Rules Approval Order 1998 (S.I. 1998 No. 2649)
 The Magistrates' Courts Committees (Dyfed and Powys) Amalgamation Order 1998 (S.I. 1998 No. 2664)
 The Dudley Priority Health National Health Service Trust (Establishment) Amendment Order 1998 (S.I. 1998 No. 2667)
 Act of Sederunt (Fees of Messengers-at-Arms) 1998 (S.I. 1998 No. 2668 (S.132)])
 Act of Sederunt (Fees of Sheriff Officers) 1998 (S.I. 1998 No. 2669 (S.133)])
 The School Standards and Framework Act 1998 (Modification) Regulations 1998 (S.I. 1998 No. 2670)
 Act of Sederunt (Rules of the Court of Session Amendment No. 3 ) (Fees of Solicitors) 1998 (S.I. 1998 No. 2674 (S.134)])
 Act of Sederunt (Fees of Solicitors in the Sheriff Court) (Amendment) 1998 (S.I. 1998 No. 2675 (S. 135)])
 The Magistrates' Courts (Sex Offender and Anti-social Behaviour Orders) Rules 1998 (S.I. 1998 No. 2682 (L. 10)])
 The General Osteopathic Council (Conditional Registration) (Amendment) Rules Order of Council 1998 (S.I. 1998 No. 2695)
 The Friendly Societies (Activities of a Subsidiary) (No. 2) Order 1998 (S.I. 1998 No. 2696)
 The Education (School Information) (Wales) (Amendment) Regulations 1998 (S.I. 1998 No. 2697)
 The Education (Grants for Education Support and Training) (England) Regulations 1998 (Amendment) (No. 2) Regulations 1998 (S.I. 1998 No. 2698)
 The City of Bristol (Electoral Changes) Order 1998 (S.I. 1998 No. 2699)
 The District of Bath and North East Somerset (Electoral Changes) Order 1998 (S.I. 1998 No. 2700)

2701-2800

 The District of South Gloucestershire (Electoral Changes) Order 1998 (S.I. 1998 No. 2701)
 The District of North Somerset (Electoral Changes) Order 1998 (S.I. 1998 No. 2702)
 The Finance Act 1998, Section 145, (Appointed Day) Order 1998 (S.I. 1998 No. 2703 (C. 63)])
 The Income Tax (Indexation) (No. 2) Order 1998 (S.I. 1998 No. 2704)
 The Education (Individual Pupils' Achievements) (Information) (Wales) (Amendment) Regulations 1998 (S.I. 1998 No. 2705)
 The Magistrates' Courts Committees (Northumbria) Amalgamation Order 1998 (S.I. 1998 No. 2707)
 The Protection of Wrecks (Designation No. 2) Order 1998 (S.I. 1998 No. 2708)
 The Borders Primary Care National Health Service Trust (Establishment) Order 1998 (S.I. 1998 No. 2709 (S. 136)])
 The Tayside Primary Care National Health Service Trust (Establishment) Order 1998 (S.I. 1998 No. 2710 (S. 137)])
 The Lothian Primary Care National Health Service Trust (Establishment) Order 1998 (S.I. 1998 No. 2711 (S. 138)])
 The Fife Primary Care National Health Service Trust (Establishment) Order 1998 (S.I. 1998 No. 2712 (S. 139)])
 The Forth Valley Primary Care National Health Service Trust (Establishment) Order 1998 (S.I. 1998 No. 2713 (S. 140)])
 The Dumfries and Galloway Primary Care National Health Service Trust (Establishment) Order 1998 (S.I. 1998 No. 2714 (S. 141)])
 The Ayrshire and Arran Primary Care National Health Service Trust (Establishment) Order 1998 (S.I. 1998 No. 2715 (S. 142)])
 The Argyll and Clyde Acute Hospitals National Health Service Trust (Establishment) Order 1998 (S.I. 1998 No. 2716 (S. 143)])
 The Lothian University Hospitals National Health Service Trust (Establishment) Order 1998 (S.I. 1998 No. 2717 (S. 144)])
 The Grampian University Hospitals National Health Service Trust (Establishment) Order 1998 (S.I. 1998 No. 2718 (S. 145)])
 The Greater Glasgow Primary Care National Health Service Trust (Establishment) Order 1998 (S.I. 1998 No. 2719 (S. 146)])
 The Grampian Primary Care National Health Service Trust (Establishment) Order 1998 (S.I. 1998 No. 2720 (S. 147)])
 The Highland Primary Care National Health Service Trust (Establishment) Order 1998 (S.I. 1998 No. 2721 (S. 148)])
 The Highland Acute Hospitals National Health Service Trust (Establishment) Order 1998 (S.I. 1998 No. 2722 (S. 149)])
 The Fife Acute Hospitals National Health Service Trust (Establishment) Order 1998 (S.I. 1998 No. 2723 (S. 150)])
 The Lanarkshire Acute Hospitals National Health Service Trust (Establishment) Order 1998 (S.I. 1998 No. 2724 (S. 151)])
 The Forth Valley Acute Hospitals National Health Service Trust (Establishment) Order 1998 (S.I. 1998 No. 2725 (S. 152)])
 The Seeds (National Lists of Varieties) (Amendment) Regulations 1998 (S.I. 1998 No. 2726)
 The Legal Advice and Assistance (Amendment) (No. 2) Regulations 1998 (S.I. 1998 No. 2727)
 The Tayside University Hospitals National Health Service Trust (Establishment) Order 1998 (S.I. 1998 No. 2728 (S. 153)])
 The North Glasgow University Hospitals National Health Service Trust (Establishment) Order 1998 (S.I. 1998 No. 2729 (S. 154)])
 The South Glasgow University Hospitals National Health Service Trust (Establishment) Order 1998 (S.I. 1998 No. 2730 (S. 155)])
 The West Lothian Healthcare National Health Service Trust (Establishment) Order 1998 (S.I. 1998 No. 2731 (S. 156)])
 The Lanarkshire Primary Care National Health Service Trust (Establishment) Order 1998 (S.I. 1998 No. 2732 (S. 157)])
 The Renfrewshire and Inverclyde Primary Care National Health Service Trust (Establishment) Order 1998 (S.I. 1998 No. 2733 (S. 158)])
 The Lomond and Argyll Primary Care National Health Service Trust (Establishment) Order 1998 (S.I. 1998 No. 2734 (S. 159)])
 The Ayrshire and Arran Acute Hospitals National Health Service Trust (Establishment) Order 1998 (S.I. 1998 No. 2735 (S. 160)])
 The A205 Trunk Road (Lewisham) Red Route Experimental Traffic Order 1998 (S.I. 1998 No. 2745)
 The Groundwater Regulations 1998 (S.I. 1998 No. 2746)
 The Competition Act 1998 (Commencement No. 1) Order 1998 (S.I. 1998 No. 2750 (C.64)])
 The Plant Protection Products (Amendment) Regulations 1998 (S.I. 1998 No. 2760)
 The Local Government Act 1988 (Defined Activities) (Exemption) (Tendring District Council) Order 1998 (S.I. 1998 No. 2762)
 The Education (School Government) (Transition to New Framework) Regulations 1998 (S.I. 1998 No. 2763)
 The Late Payment of Commercial Debts (Rate of Interest) (No. 2) Order 1998 (S.I. 1998 No. 2765)
 The Co-operation of Insolvency Courts (Designation of Relevant Country) Order 1998 (S.I. 1998 No. 2766)
 The Value Added Tax (Input Tax) (Amendment) Order 1998 (S.I. 1998 No. 2767)
 The Judicial Pensions (European Court of Human Rights) Order 1998 (S.I. 1998 No. 2768)
 The Magistrates' Courts Committees (West Yorkshire) Amalgamation Order 1998 (S.I. 1998 No. 2769)
 The Limit in Relation to Provision of Digital Programme Services Order 1998 (S.I. 1998 No. 2770)
 The Merchant Shipping (Vessels in Commercial Use for Sport or Pleasure) Regulations 1998 (S.I. 1998 No. 2771)
 The National Health Service (Travelling Expenses and Remission of Charges) (Scotland) Amendment Regulations 1998 (S.I. 1998 No. 2772 (S.161)])
 The Social Security Administration (Fraud) Act 1997 (Commencement No. 6) Order 1998 (S.I. 1998 No. 2779 (C.65)])
 The Social Security Act 1998 (Commencement No. 2) Order 1998 (S.I. 1998 No. 2780 (C.66)])
 The Government of Wales Act 1998 (Commencement No. 2) Order 1998 (S.I. 1998 No. 2789 (C.67)])
 The Bethlem and Maudsley National Health Service Trust (Transfer of Trust Property) Order 1998 (S.I. 1998 No. 2790)
 The School Standards and Framework Act 1998 (Commencement No. 3 and Saving and Transitional Provisions) Order 1998 (S.I. 1998 No. 2791 (C. 68)])
 The Education (Schools and Further Education) (Amendment) Regulations 1998 (S.I. 1998 No. 2792)
 The European Communities (Designation) (No. 3) Order 1998 (S.I. 1998 No. 2793)
 The Chemical Weapons Act 1996 (Isle of Man) Order 1998 (S.I. 1998 No. 2794)
 Health and Safety at Work (Amendment) (Northern Ireland) Order 1998 (S.I. 1998 No. 2795 (N.I. 18)])
 Local Government (Amendment) (Northern Ireland) Order 1998 (S.I. 1998 No. 2796 (N.I. 19)])
 The Transfer of Prisoners (Isle of Man) (Amendment) Order 1998 (S.I. 1998 No. 2797)
 The Transfer of Prisoners (Restricted Transfers) (Channel Islands and Isle of Man) Order 1998 (S.I. 1998 No. 2798)
 The Child Support (Miscellaneous Amendments) (No. 2) Regulations 1998 (S.I. 1998 No. 2799)
 The Town and Country Planning General (Amendment) Regulations 1998 (S.I. 1998 No. 2800)

2801-2900

 The Edinburgh Healthcare National Health Service Trust (Establishment) Amendment Order 1998 (S.I. 1998 No. 2802 (S. 162)])
 The Perth and Kinross (Electoral Arrangements) Order 1998 (S.I. 1998 No. 2803 (S. 163)])
 The East Lothian (Electoral Arrangements) Order 1998 (S.I. 1998 No. 2804 (S. 164)])
 The Angus (Electoral Arrangements) Order 1998 (S.I. 1998 No. 2806 (S. 165)])
 The Social Security (New Deal Pilot) Regulations 1998 (S.I. 1998 No. 2825)
 The Legal Advice and Assistance (Scope) (Amendment) Regulations 1998 (S.I. 1998 No. 2831)
 The School Standards and Framework Act 1998 (Home–School Agreements) (Modification) Regulations 1998 (S.I. 1998 No. 2834)
 The Building Societies Act 1997 (Expiry of Transitional Period) Order 1998 (S.I. 1998 No. 2835)
 The Non-Domestic Rating (Rural Settlements) (England) (No. 2) Order 1998 (S.I. 1998 No. 2836)
 The London Ambulance Service National Health Service Trust (Establishment) Amendment Order 1998 (S.I. 1998 No. 2837)
 The National Health Service (General Medical Services) Amendment (No. 2) Regulations 1998 (S.I. 1998 No. 2838)
 The Criminal Justice (Northern Ireland) Order 1998 (S.I. 1998 No. 2839 (N.I. 20)])
 The National Health Service (Primary Care) Act 1997 (Commencement No. 6) Order 1998 (S.I. 1998 No. 2840 (C.69)])
 The Hereford and Worcester Ambulance Service National Health Service Trust (Establishment) Amendment Order 1998 (S.I. 1998 No. 2841)
 The Contracting Out (Functions in Relation to Insurance) Order 1998 (S.I. 1998 No. 2842)
 The Borough of Congleton (Electoral Changes) Order 1998 (S.I. 1998 No. 2843)
 The Borough of Ellesmere Port & Neston (Electoral Changes) Order 1998 (S.I. 1998 No. 2844)
 The Borough of Crewe and Nantwich (Electoral Changes) Order 1998 (S.I. 1998 No. 2845)
 The Borough of Vale Royal (Electoral Changes) Order 1998 (S.I. 1998 No. 2846)
 The Borough of Macclesfield (Electoral Changes) Order 1998 (S.I. 1998 No. 2847)
 The Merchant Shipping and Fishing Vessels (Manual Handling Operations) Regulations 1998 (S.I. 1998 No. 2857)
 The Residuary Body for Wales (Winding Up) Order 1998 (S.I. 1998 No. 2859)
 The Local Government Act 1988 (Defined Activities) (Exemption) (Christchurch Borough Council and Purbeck District Council) Order 1998 (S.I. 1998 No. 2862)
 The Fees for Inquiries (Standard Daily Amount) Regulations 1998 (S.I. 1998 No. 2864)
 The Income-related Benefits (Subsidy to Authorities) Amendment Order 1998 (S.I. 1998 No. 2865)
 The City of Chester (Electoral Changes) Order 1998 (S.I. 1998 No. 2866)
 The Herring (Specified Sea Areas) (Prohibition of Fishing) Order 1998 (S.I. 1998 No. 2867)
 The Commercial Agents (Council Directive) (Amendment) Regulations 1998 (S.I. 1998 No. 2868)
 The Northern Ireland (Sentences) Act 1998 (Specified Organisations) (No. 2) Order 1998 (S.I. 1998 No. 2869)
 The Representation of the People (Northern Ireland) (Amendment) Regulations 1998 (S.I. 1998 No. 2870)
 The North Hull Housing Action Trust (Dissolution) Order 1998 (S.I. 1998 No. 2871)
 The Registration of Political Parties (Fees) Order 1998 (S.I. 1998 No. 2872)
 The Registration of Political Parties (Prohibited Words and Expressions) Order 1998 (S.I. 1998 No. 2873)
 The Jobseeker's Allowance Amendment (New Deal) Regulations 1998 (S.I. 1998 No. 2874)
 The Registration of Political Parties (Access to the Register) Regulations 1998 (S.I. 1998 No. 2875)
 The Education (Grammar School Ballots) Regulations 1998 (S.I. 1998 No. 2876)
 The School Standards and Framework Act 1998 (Home–School Agreements) (Appointed Day) Order 1998 (S.I. 1998 No. 2877 (C.70)])
 The Income Support (General) (Standard Interest Rate Amendment) (No. 2) Regulations 1998 (S.I. 1998 No. 2878)
 The Charges for Inspections and Controls (Amendment) Regulations 1998 (S.I. 1998 No. 2880)
 The Human Rights Act 1998 (Commencement) Order 1998 (S.I. 1998 No. 2882 (C.71)])
 The Charities (Royal Russell School) Order 1998 (S.I. 1998 No. 2883)
 The Motor Vehicles (Authorisation of Special Types) (Amendment) (No. 2) Order 1998 (S.I. 1998 No. 2884)
 The Carriage of Dangerous Goods (Amendment) Regulations 1998 (S.I. 1998 No. 2885)
 The Further and Higher Education (Scotland) Act 1992 (Commencement No.2) Order 1998 (S.I. 1998 No. 2886 (C.72) (S.166)])
 The Scottish Further Education Funding Council (Establishment) (Scotland) Order 1998 (S.I. 1998 No. 2887 (S.167)])
 The Local Government Pension Scheme (Management and Investment of Funds) (Scotland) Regulations 1998 (S.I. 1998 No. 2888 (S.168)])
 The Social Security (Contributions)Amendment (No. 5) Regulations 1998 (S.I. 1998 No. 2894)

2901-3000

 The Crime and Disorder Act 1998 (Commencement No. 2 and Transitional Provisions) (Amendment) (No. 2) Order 1998 (S.I. 1998 No. 2906 (C.73)])
 The Legal Advice and Assistance (Amendment) (No. 3) Regulations 1998 (S.I. 1998 No. 2907)
 The Legal Aid in Criminal and Care Proceedings (Costs) (Amendment) (No. 3) Regulations 1998 (S.I. 1998 No. 2908)
 The Legal Aid in Criminal and Care Proceedings (General) (Amendment) (No. 2) Regulations 1998 (S.I. 1998 No. 2909)
 The Civil Courts (Amendment) (No. 2) Order 1998 (S.I. 1998 No. 2910)
 The General Teaching Council for Wales Order 1998 (S.I. 1998 No. 2911)
 The Swansea–Manchester Trunk Road (A483) (Llandovery County Primary School Layby Detrunking) Order 1998 (S.I. 1998 No. 2912)
 The Town and Country Planning (Minerals) (Scotland) Regulations 1998 (S.I. 1998 No. 2913 (S. 169)])
 The Town and Country Planning (Compensation for Restrictions on Mineral Working and Mineral Waste Depositing) (Scotland) Regulations 1998 (S.I. 1998 No. 2914 (S. 170)])
 The Channel 4 (Application of Excess Revenues) Order 1998 (S.I. 1998 No. 2915)
 The School Standards and Framework Act 1998 (Allowances for Governors and Individual Pupil Information) (Modification) Regulations 1998 (S.I. 1998 No. 2916)
 The Carriage of Passengers and their Luggage by Sea (United Kingdom Carriers) Order 1998 (S.I. 1998 No. 2917)
 The Airports (Groundhandling) (Amendment) Regulations 1998 (S.I. 1998 No. 2918)
 The Greater Manchester (Light Rapid Transit System) (Land Acquisition) Order 1998 (S.I. 1998 No. 2919)
 The Life Assurance (Apportionment of Receipts of Participating Funds) (Applicable Percentage) (Amendment) Order 1998 (S.I. 1998 No. 2920)
 The Occupational Pensions (Revaluation) Order 1998 (S.I. 1998 No. 2921)
 The Pesticides (Maximum Residue Levels in Crops, Food and Feeding Stuffs) (Amendment) Regulations 1998 (S.I. 1998 No. 2922)
 The Chichester Priority Care Services National Health Service Trust (Change of Name) Order 1998 (S.I. 1998 No. 2923)
 The Action Programme for Nitrate Vulnerable Zones (Scotland) Regulations 1998 (S.I. 1998 No. 2927 (S. 171)])
 The Civil Procedure (Modification of Enactments) Order 1998 (S.I. 1998 No. 2940)
 The Queen's Medical Centre, Nottingham, University Hospital National Health Service Trust (Establishment) Amendment Order 1998 (S.I. 1998 No. 2947)
 The Herefordshire Community Health National Health Service Trust (Establishment) Amendment Order 1998 (S.I. 1998 No. 2948)
 The Warwickshire Ambulance Service National Health Service Trust (Establishment) Amendment Order 1998 (S.I. 1998 No. 2949)
 The South Tees Acute Hospitals National Health Service Trust (Establishment) Amendment Order 1998 (S.I. 1998 No. 2950)
 The Regional Development Agencies Act 1998 (Commencement No. 1) Order 1998 (S.I. 1998 No. 2952 (C.74)])
 The Dissolution of the Broadcasting Complaints Commission and the Broadcasting Standards Council Order 1998 (S.I. 1998 No. 2954)
 The Local Government Act 1988 (Defined Activities) (Exemption) (Lichfield District Council) Order 1998 (S.I. 1998 No. 2955)
 The Local Authorities (Goods and Services) (Public Bodies) (No. 5) Order 1998 (S.I. 1998 No. 2956)
 The Non-Domestic Rating Contributions (Scotland) Amendment Regulations 1998 (S.I. 1998 No. 2957 (S. 172)])
 The Severn Bridges Tolls Order 1998 (S.I. 1998 No. 2958)
 The Non-Domestic Rating Contributions (Wales) (Amendment) Regulations 1998 (S.I. 1998 No. 2962)
 The Non-Domestic Rating (Rural Settlements) (Wales) Order 1998 (S.I. 1998 No. 2963)
 The Riverside Mental Health, the North West London Mental Health and the West London Healthcare National Health Service Trusts (Dissolution) Order 1998 (S.I. 1998 No. 2964)
 The Ealing, Hammersmith and Fulham Mental Health National Health Service Trust (Establishment) Order 1998 (S.I. 1998 No. 2965)
 The Brent, Kensington & Chelsea and Westminster Mental Health National Health Service Trust (Establishment) Order 1998 (S.I. 1998 No. 2966)
 The Afan College (Dissolution) Order 1998 (S.I. 1998 No. 2967)
 The Cattle Identification (Amendment) Regulations 1998 (S.I. 1998 No. 2969)
 The Wireless Telegraphy (Visiting Ships and Aircraft) Regulations 1998 (S.I. 1998 No. 2970)
 The Electricity Supply (Amendment) Regulations 1998 (S.I. 1998 No. 2971)
 The North Staffordshire Combined Healthcare National Health Service Trust (Establishment) Amendment Order 1998 (S.I. 1998 No. 2972)
 The Statistics of Trade (Customs and Excise) (Amendment) Regulations 1998 (S.I. 1998 No. 2973)
 The Land Registration (District Registries) (No. 2) Order 1998 (S.I. 1998 No. 2974)
 The Civil Aviation (Navigation Services Charges) (Amendment) Regulations 1998 (S.I. 1998 No. 2975)
 The Merchant Shipping (Registration of Ships) (Amendment) Regulations 1998 (S.I. 1998 No. 2976)
 The Hallmarking (Hallmarking Act Amendment) Regulations 1998 (S.I. 1998 No. 2978)
 The Hallmarking (Hallmarking Act Amendment) Order 1998 (S.I. 1998 No. 2979)
 The Land Registration (Scotland) Act 1979 (Commencement No.12) Order 1998 (S.I. 1998 No. 2980 (C. 75) (S. 173)])
 The Frenchay Healthcare National Health Service Trust (Establishment) Amendment Order 1998 (S.I. 1998 No. 2993)
 The Non-automatic Weighing Instruments (EEC Requirements) (Amendment) Regulations 1998 (S.I. 1998 No. 2994)
 The Revenue Support Grant (Specified Bodies) (Amendment) Regulations 1998 (S.I. 1998 No. 2995)
 The Insurance Companies (Amendment) Regulations 1998 (S.I. 1998 No. 2996)
 The Housing (Right to Buy) (Limits on Discount) Order 1998 (S.I. 1998 No. 2997)
 The Home Repair Assistance (Extension) Regulations 1998 (S.I. 1998 No. 2998)
 The Civil Aviation (Route Charges for Navigation Services) (Second Amendment) Regulations 1998 (S.I. 1998 No. 2999)
 The Civil Aviation (Joint Financing) (Amendment) Regulations 1998 (S.I. 1998 No. 3000)

3001-3100

 The Public Telecommunication System Designation (NETs Limited) Order 1998 (S.I. 1998 No. 3001)
 The Public Telecommunication System Designation (Data Marine Systems Limited) Order 1998 (S.I. 1998 No. 3002)
 The Public Telecommunication System Designation (PT–1 Communications UK Limited) Order 1998 (S.I. 1998 No. 3003)
 The Public Telecommunication System Designation (Ibercom Limited) Order 1998 (S.I. 1998 No. 3004)
 The Public Telecommunication System Designation (Storm Telecommunications Limited) Order 1998 (S.I. 1998 No. 3005)
 The Public Telecommunication System Designation (Worldport Communications Limited) Order 1998 (S.I. 1998 No. 3006)
 The Public Telecommunication System Designation (KPN Telecom UK Limited) Order 1998 (S.I. 1998 No. 3007)
 The Public Telecommunication System Designation (Cignal Global Communications U.K. Limited) Order 1998 (S.I. 1998 No. 3008)
 The Public Telecommunication System Designation (Viatel UK Limited) Order 1998 (S.I. 1998 No. 3009)
 The Public Telecommunication System Designation (Teleport London International Limited) Order 1998 (S.I. 1998 No. 3010)
 The Public Telecommunication System Designation (Internet Network Services Limited) Order 1998 (S.I. 1998 No. 3011)
 The Public Telecommunication System Designation (MLL Telecom Limited) Order 1998 (S.I. 1998 No. 3012)
 The Public Telecommunication System Designation (International Computers Limited) Order 1998 (S.I. 1998 No. 3013)
 The Public Telecommunication System Designation (Qwest Communications International Limited) Order 1998 (S.I. 1998 No. 3014)
 The Public Telecommunication System Designation (Witley Communications Limited) Order 1998 (S.I. 1998 No. 3015)
 The Public Telecommunication System Designation (International Telecommunications Group Inc) Order 1998 (S.I. 1998 No. 3016)
 The Public Telecommunication System Designation (EGN BV) Order 1998 (S.I. 1998 No. 3017)
 The Public Telecommunication System Designation (The JNT Association) Order 1998 (S.I. 1998 No. 3018)
 The Public Telecommunication System Designation (NorSea Com A/S) Order 1998 (S.I. 1998 No. 3019)
 The Public Telecommunication System Designation (Telecom One Limited) Order 1998 (S.I. 1998 No. 3020)
 The Public Telecommunication System Designation (International Telecom Plc) Order 1998 (S.I. 1998 No. 3021)
 The Public Telecommunication System Designation (UTG Communications (Europe) AG) Order 1998 (S.I. 1998 No. 3022)
 The Public Telecommunication System Designation (VersaTel Telecom BV) Order 1998 (S.I. 1998 No. 3023)
 The County Court (Forms) (Amendment No. 2) Rules 1998 (S.I. 1998 No. 3024 (L.11)])
 The Special Trustees for Newcastle University Hospital (Transfer of Trust Property) Order 1998 (S.I. 1998 No. 3028)
 The Superannuation (Admission to Schedule 1 to the Superannuation Act 1972) (No. 3) Order 1998 (S.I. 1998 No. 3030)
 The National Health Service (Pharmaceutical Services) (Scotland) Amendment Regulations 1998 (S.I. 1998 No. 3031 (S. 174)])
 The Friendly Societies (Insurance Business) (Amendment) Regulations 1998 (S.I. 1998 No. 3034)
 The Industry Act 1975 (Prohibition and Vesting Order) Regulations 1998 (S.I. 1998 No. 3035)
 The Wireless Telegraphy Appeal Tribunal Rules 1998 (S.I. 1998 No. 3036)
 The Prosecution of Offences (Custody Time Limits) (Modification) Regulations 1998 (S.I. 1998 No. 3037)
 The Non-Domestic Rating Contributions (England) (Amendment) Regulations 1998 (S.I. 1998 No. 3038)
 The Social Security (Claims and Payments) Amendment (No. 2) Regulations 1998 (S.I. 1998 No. 3039)
 The Indictments (Procedure) (Modification) Rules 1998 (S.I. 1998 No. 3045 (L. 12)])
 The Magistrates' Courts (Modification) Rules 1998 (S.I. 1998 No. 3046 (L. 13)])
 The Crown Court (Modification) Rules 1998 (S.I. 1998 No. 3047 (L.14)])
 The Crime and Disorder Act 1998 (Dismissal of Charges Sent) Rules 1998 (S.I. 1998 No. 3048 (L.15)])
 The Rules of the Supreme Court (Amendment No. 2) 1998 (S.I. 1998 No. 3049 (L. 16)])
 The Consumer Protection (Cancellation of Contracts Concluded away from Business Premises) (Amendment) Regulations 1998 (S.I. 1998 No. 3050)
 The Grants for Improvements in School Education (Scotland) Regulations 1998 (S.I. 1998 No. 3051 (S. 175)])
 The National Health Service (Choice of Dental Practitioner) (Scotland) Amendment Regulations 1998 (S.I. 1998 No. 3052 (S. 176)])
 The Local Government Act 1988 (Defined Activities) (Exemption) (Poole Borough Council) Order 1998 (S.I. 1998 No. 3053)
 The East Brighton Education Action Zone Order 1998 (S.I. 1998 No. 3054)
 The Thetford Education Action Zone Order 1998 (S.I. 1998 No. 3055)
 The Leigh Education Action Zone Order 1998 (S.I. 1998 No. 3056)
 The North Southwark Education Action Zone Order 1998 (S.I. 1998 No. 3057)
 The South Tyneside Education Action Zone Order 1998 (S.I. 1998 No. 3058)
 The North East Sheffield Education Action Zone Order 1998 (S.I. 1998 No. 3059)
 The Plymouth Education Action Zone Order 1998 (S.I. 1998 No. 3060)
 The Nottingham (Bulwell) Education Action Zone Order 1998 (S.I. 1998 No. 3061)
 The Birmingham (Kitts Green and Shard End) Education Action Zone Order 1998 (S.I. 1998 No. 3062)
 The Kingston upon Hull (Bransholme Area) Education Action Zone Order 1998 (S.I. 1998 No. 3063)
 The Halifax Education Action Zone Order 1998 (S.I. 1998 No. 3064)
 The East Basildon Education Action Zone Order 1998 (S.I. 1998 No. 3065)
 The Birmingham (Aston and Nechells) Education Action Zone Order 1998 (S.I. 1998 No. 3066)
 The Curfew Order (Responsible Officer) (Amendment) Order 1998 (S.I. 1998 No. 3067)
 The Leicestershire Mental Health Service and the Fosse Health, Leicestershire Community National Health Service Trusts (Dissolution) Order 1998 (S.I. 1998 No. 3068)
 The Leicestershire and Rutland Healthcare National Health Service Trust (Establishment) Order 1998 (S.I. 1998 No. 3069)
 The BSE Offspring Slaughter Regulations 1998 (S.I. 1998 No. 3070)
 The Bovine Spongiform Encephalopathy (No. 2) (Amendment) Order 1998 (S.I. 1998 No. 3071)
 The Midlothian (Electoral Arrangements) Order 1998 (S.I. 1998 No. 3072 (S. 177)])
 The Inverclyde (Electoral Arrangements) Order 1998 (S.I. 1998 No. 3074 (S. 179)])
 The West Dunbartonshire (Electoral Arrangements) Order 1998 (S.I. 1998 No. 3075 (S. 180)])
 The West Lothian (Electoral Arrangements) Order 1998 (S.I. 1998 No. 3076 (S. 181)])
 The Glasgow City (Electoral Arrangements) Order 1998 (S.I. 1998 No. 3078 (S. 178)])
 The Meat and Livestock Commission Levy (Variation) Scheme (Confirmation) Order 1998 (S.I. 1998 No. 3080)
 The Controlled Foreign Companies (Excluded Countries) Regulations 1998 (S.I. 1998 No. 3081)
 The Walsgrave Hospitals National Health Service Trust (Establishment) Amendment Order 1998 (S.I. 1998 No. 3082)
 The Foreign Satellite Service Proscription (No. 2) Order 1998 (S.I. 1998 No. 3083)
 The Water (Prevention of Pollution) (Code of Practice) Order 1998 (S.I. 1998 No. 3084)
 The Medicines (Pharmacies) (Applications for Registration and Fees) Amendment Regulations 1998 (S.I. 1998 No. 3085)
 The Reserve Forces Act 1996 (Consequential Provisions etc.) Regulations 1998 (S.I. 1998 No. 3086)
 The Open-Ended Investment Companies (Investment Companies with Variable Capital) (Fees) Regulations 1998 (S.I. 1998 No. 3087)
 The Companies (Fees) (Amendment) Regulations 1998 (S.I. 1998 No. 3088)
 The Non-Domestic Rating (Collection and Enforcement) (Local Lists) (Amendment) Regulations 1998 (S.I. 1998 No. 3089)
 The M4 Motorway (London Borough of Hounslow) (Bus Lane) Order 1998 (S.I. 1998 No. 3090)
 The Finance Act 1998 (Commencement No. 1) Order 1998 (S.I. 1998 No. 3092 (C.76)])
 The Motor Vehicles (Type Approval of Reduced Pollution Adaptations) Regulations 1998 (S.I. 1998 No. 3093)
 The Vehicle Excise Duty (Reduced Pollution) Regulations 1998 (S.I. 1998 No. 3094)
 The Local Authorities (Goods and Services) (Public Bodies) (No. 6) Order 1998 (S.I. 1998 No. 3095)
 The Smoke Control Areas (Authorised Fuels) (Amendment No. 2) Regulations 1998 (S.I. 1998 No. 3096)
 The Education (Government of New Schools on Transition to New Framework) Regulations 1998 (S.I. 1998 No. 3097)
 The Southampton Community Health Services National Health Service Trust (Establishment) Amendment Order 1998 (S.I. 1998 No. 3098)
 The Register of Sasines (Registers Direct) (Scotland) Regulations 1998 (S.I. 1998 No. 3099 (S. 182)])
 The Land Registration (Scotland) Amendment Rules 1998 (S.I. 1998 No. 3100 (S. 183))

3101-3200

 The Clackmannanshire (Electoral Arrangements) Order 1998 (S.I. 1998 No. 3101 (S. 184)])
 The East Renfrewshire (Electoral Arrangements) Order 1998 (S.I. 1998 No. 3102 (S. 185)])
 The Scottish Borders (Electoral Arrangements) Order 1998 (S.I. 1998 No. 3103 (S. 186)])
 The Aberdeen City (Electoral Arrangements) Order 1998 (S.I. 1998 No. 3104 (S. 187)])
 The Medicines for Human Use (Marketing Authorisation Etc.) Amendment Regulations 1998 (S.I. 1998 No. 3105)
 The Chemicals (Hazard Information and Packaging for Supply) (Amendment) Regulations 1998 (S.I. 1998 No. 3106)
 The Justices' Clerks (Qualifications of Assistants) (Amendment) Rules 1998 (S.I. 1998 No. 3107 (L. 18)])
 The Magistrates' Courts Committees (Northumbria) Amalgamation (Amendment) Order 1998 (S.I. 1998 No. 3108)
 The Plant Health (Forestry) (Great Britain) (Amendment) (No. 2) Order 1998 (S.I. 1998 No. 3109)
 The Excise Duty Point (External and Internal Community Transit Procedure) (Amendment) Regulations 1998 (S.I. 1998 No. 3110)
 The Road Vehicles (Authorised Weight) Regulations 1998 (S.I. 1998 No. 3111)
 The Road Vehicles (Construction and Use) (Amendment) (No. 7) Regulations 1998 (S.I. 1998 No. 3112)
 The Goods Vehicles (Plating and Testing) (Amendment) (No. 2) Regulations 1998 (S.I. 1998 No. 3113)
 The Local Government Act 1988 (Defined Activities) (Exemptions) (Hastings and Luton Borough Councils) Order 1998 (S.I. 1998 No. 3114)
 The Crime and Disorder Act 1998 (Service of Prosecution Evidence) Regulations 1998 (S.I. 1998 No. 3115)
 The Local Government Officers (Political Restrictions) Amendment Regulations 1998 (S.I. 1998 No. 3116 (S. 188)])
 The General Optical Council (Membership) Order of Council 1998 (S.I. 1998 No. 3117)
 The Sole, Plaice and Other Species (Specified Sea Areas) (Prohibition of Fishing) Order 1998 (S.I. 1998 No. 3118)
 The A1 Trunk Road (Barnet) Red Route (Clearway) Traffic Order 1996 Variation Order 1998 (S.I. 1998 No. 3127)
 The London Borough of Lambeth (Trunk Roads) Red Route (Bus Priority) Traffic Order 1998 (S.I. 1998 No. 3128)
 The Building (Local Authority Charges) Regulations 1998 (S.I. 1998 No. 3129)
 The School Standards and Framework Act 1998 (Admissions) (Modifications No. 2) Regulations 1998 (S.I. 1998 No. 3130)
 The Lancaster City Council (The River Lune Millennium Bridge) Scheme 1998 Confirmation Instrument 1998 (S.I. 1998 No. 3131)
 The Civil Procedure Rules 1998 (S.I. 1998 No. 3132 (L.17)])
 The Magistrates' Courts Committees (Avon and Somerset) Amalgamation Order 1998 (S.I. 1998 No. 3133)
 The County Borough of Bridgend (Electoral Arrangements) Order 1998 (S.I. 1998 No. 3134)
 The County Borough of Caerphilly (Electoral Arrangements) Order 1998 (S.I. 1998 No. 3135)
 The County of Carmarthenshire (Electoral Arrangements) Order 1998 (S.I. 1998 No. 3136)
 The County Borough of Conwy (Electoral Arrangements) Order 1998 (S.I. 1998 No. 3137)
 The County Borough of Rhondda Cynon Taff (Electoral Arrangements) Order 1998 (S.I. 1998 No. 3138)
 The County of Denbighshire (Electoral Arrangements) Order 1998 (S.I. 1998 No. 3139)
 The County of Flintshire (Electoral Arrangements) Order 1998 (S.I. 1998 No. 3140)
 The County of Pembrokeshire (Electoral Arrangements) Order 1998 (S.I. 1998 No. 3141)
 The County Borough of Wrexham (Electoral Arrangements) Order 1998 (S.I. 1998 No. 3142)
 The County of Powys (Electoral Arrangements) Order 1998 (S.I. 1998 No. 3143)
 The West Lancashire (Parishes) Order 1998 (S.I. 1998 No. 3144)
 The Merchant Shipping (Falkland Islands Colours) Order 1998 (S.I. 1998 No. 3147)
 The Wireless Telegraphy (Colonial Ships and Aircraft) (Revocation) Order 1998 (S.I. 1998 No. 3148)
 The Health Service Commissioner for England (London Post-Graduate Teaching Hospitals Designation Orders) Revocation Order 1998 (S.I. 1998 No. 3149)
 The Local Elections (Northern Ireland) (Amendment) Order 1998 (S.I. 1998 No. 3150)
 The Double Taxation Relief (Taxes on Income) (Ireland) Order 1998 (S.I. 1998 No. 3151)
 The Parliamentary Constituencies (England) (Miscellaneous Changes) Order 1998 (S.I. 1998 No. 3152)
 The Mackerel (Specified Sea Areas) (Prohibition of Fishing) Order 1998 (S.I. 1998 No. 3153)
 The Legal Aid in Criminal and Care Proceedings (Costs) (Amendment) (No. 4) Regulations 1998 (S.I. 1998 No. 3154)
 The British Nationality (Cameroon and Mozambique) Order 1998 (S.I. 1998 No. 3161)
 The Fair Employment and Treatment (Northern Ireland) Order 1998 (S.I. 1998 No. 3162 (N.I. 21)])
 The Iraq and Kuwait (United Nations Sanctions) (Amendment) Order 1998 (S.I. 1998 No. 3163)
 The Rates (Amendment) (Northern Ireland) Order 1998 (S.I. 1998 No. 3164 (N.I. 22)])
 The Education (Determining School Admission Arrangements for the Initial Year) Regulations 1998 (S.I. 1998 No. 3165)
 The Competition Act 1998 (Commencement No. 2) Order 1998 (S.I. 1998 No. 3166 (C.77)])
 The Potatoes Originating in Egypt (Amendment) Regulations 1998 (S.I. 1998 No. 3167)
 The Potatoes Originating in The Netherlands (Amendment) Regulations 1998 (S.I. 1998 No. 3168)
 The Arable Area Payments (Amendment) Regulations 1998 (S.I. 1998 No. 3169)
 The Telecommunications (Data Protection and Privacy) (Direct Marketing) Regulations 1998 (S.I. 1998 No. 3170)
 The Registration of Births, Deaths and Marriages (Fees) Order 1998 (S.I. 1998 No. 3171)
 The School Standards and Framework Act 1998 (Proposals under section 211 of the Education Act 1996) (Transitional Provisions) Regulations 1998 (S.I. 1998 No. 3172)
 The Finance Act 1994, Section 199, (Appointed Day) Order 1998 (S.I. 1998 No. 3173 (C.78)])
 The Individual Savings Account (Amendment) Regulations 1998 (S.I. 1998 No. 3174)
 The Corporation Tax (Instalment Payments)Regulations 1998 (S.I. 1998 No. 3175)
 The Taxes (Interest Rate) (Amendment No. 2) Regulations 1998 (S.I. 1998 No. 3176)
 The European Single Currency (Taxes) Regulations 1998 (S.I. 1998 No. 3177)
 The Scotland Act 1998 (Commencement) Order 1998 (S.I. 1998 No. 3178 (C. 79) (S. 193)])
 The North Ayrshire (Electoral Arrangements) Order 1998 (S.I. 1998 No. 3179 (S. 189)])
 The Dumfries and Galloway (Electoral Arrangements) Order 1998 (S.I. 1998 No. 3180 (S. 190)])
 The Dundee City (Electoral Arrangements) Order 1998 (S.I. 1998 No. 3181 (S. 191)])
 The City of Edinburgh (Electoral Arrangements) Order 1998 (S.I. 1998 No. 3182 (S. 192)])
 The Combined Probation Areas (Dyfed) Order 1998 (S.I. 1998 No. 3185)
 The Building Societies (Business Names) Regulations 1998 (S.I. 1998 No. 3186)
 The Combined Probation Areas (Kent) Order 1998 (S.I. 1998 No. 3187)
 The Combined Probation Areas (North Yorkshire) (No. 2) Order 1998 (S.I. 1998 No. 3188)
 The Combined Probation Areas (Leicestershire) Order 1998 (S.I. 1998 No. 3189)
 The Births, Deaths, Marriages and Divorces (Fees) (Scotland) Amendment Regulations 1998 (S.I. 1998 No. 3191 (S.194)])
 The Homerton Hospital National Health Service Trust (Establishment) Amendment Order 1998 (S.I. 1998 No. 3192)
 The Television Broadcasting Regulations 1998 (S.I. 1998 No. 3196)
 The Forensic Science Service Trading Fund Order 1998 (S.I. 1998 No. 3197)
 The School Standards and Framework Act 1998 (Commencement No. 4 and Transitional Provisions) Order 1998 (S.I. 1998 No. 3198 (C. 80)])
 The Land Registration Fees Order 1998 (S.I. 1998 No. 3199)

3201-3300

 The A41 Trunk Road (Camden) Red Route (Bus Priority) Traffic Order 1998 (S.I. 1998 No. 3206)
 The Road Traffic (Permitted Parking Area and Special Parking Area) (Borough of Luton) Order 1998 (S.I. 1998 No. 3207)
 The A13 Trunk Road (Tower Hamlets) Red Route Experimental Traffic Order 1998 (S.I. 1998 No. 3212)
 The A205 Trunk Road (Lewisham) Red Route(Cycle Lane) Traffic Order 1998 (S.I. 1998 No. 3213)
 The A41 Trunk Road (Camden) Red Route Traffic Order 1998 Variation Order 1998 (S.I. 1998 No. 3214)
 The Number of Members of South Wales Police Authority Order 1998 (S.I. 1998 No. 3215)
 The Scotland Act 1998 (Transitional and Transitory Provisions) (Subordinate Legislation under the Act) Order 1998 (S.I. 1998 No. 3216 (S.195)])
 The School Standards and Framework Act 1998(Modification) (No. 2) Regulations 1998 (S.I. 1998 No. 3217)
 The Parole Board (Transfer of Functions) Order 1998 (S.I. 1998 No. 3218)
 The Local Authorities Etc. (Allowances) (Scotland) Amendment Regulations 1998 (S.I. 1998 No. 3219 (S.197)])
 The Security for Private Road Works (Scotland) Amendment Regulations 1998 (S.I. 1998 No. 3220 (S. 196)])
 The Local Government Act 1988 (Defined Activities) (Exemptions) (No. 4) Order 1998 (S.I. 1998 No. 3232)
 The Asbestos (Licensing) (Amendment) Regulations 1998 (S.I. 1998 No. 3233)
 The Financial Assistance for Environmental Purposes (No. 4) Order 1998 (S.I. 1998 No. 3234)
 The Control of Asbestos at Work (Amendment) Regulations 1998 (S.I. 1998 No. 3235)
 The Teaching and Higher Education Act 1998 (Commencement No. 4 and Transitional Provisions) Order 1998 (S.I. 1998 No. 3237 (C. 81)])
 The Road Traffic (Special Parking Area) (London Borough of Redbridge) (Amendment) Order 1998 (S.I. 1998 No. 3238)
 The Aberdeenshire (Electoral Arrangements) Order 1998 (S.I. 1998 No. 3239 (S. 198)])
 The Police Act 1997 (Authorisation of Action in Respect of Property) (Code of Practice) Order 1998 (S.I. 1998 No. 3240)
 The Police Act 1997 (Notification of Authorisations etc.) Order 1998 (S.I. 1998 No. 3241)
 The Fife (Electoral Arrangements) Order 1998 (S.I. 1998 No. 3243 (S. 199)])
 The Argyll and Bute (Electoral Arrangements) Order 1998 (S.I. 1998 No. 3244 (S. 200)])
 The East Dunbartonshire (Electoral Arrangements) Order 1998 (S.I. 1998 No. 3245 (S. 201)])
 The East Ayrshire (Electoral Arrangements) Order 1998 (S.I. 1998 No. 3246 (S. 202)])
 The South Ayrshire (Electoral Arrangements) Order 1998 (S.I. 1998 No. 3247 (S. 203)])
 The Highland (Electoral Arrangements) Order 1998 (S.I. 1998 No. 3248 (S. 204)])
 The Renfrewshire (Electoral Arrangements) Order 1998 (S.I. 1998 No. 3249 (S. 205)])
 The Comhairle nan Eilean Siar (Electoral Arrangements) Order 1998 (S.I. 1998 No. 3250 (S. 206)])
 The North Lanarkshire (Electoral Arrangements) Order 1998 (S.I. 1998 No. 3251 (S. 207)])
 The South Lanarkshire (Electoral Arrangements) Order 1998 (S.I. 1998 No. 3252 (S. 208)])
 The Stirling (Electoral Arrangements) Order 1998 (S.I. 1998 No. 3253 (S. 209)])
 The Falkirk (Electoral Arrangements) Order 1998 (S.I. 1998 No. 3254 (S. 210)])
 The Moray (Electoral Arrangements) Order 1998 (S.I. 1998 No. 3255 (S.211)])
 Act of Sederunt (Fees of Messengers-at-Arms) (Amendment) 1998 (S.I. 1998 No. 3256 (S. 212)])
 The Housing Benefit (General) Amendment (No. 2) Regulations 1998 (S.I. 1998 No. 3257)
 The NCIS Service Authority (Levying) (Amendment) Order 1998 (S.I. 1998 No. 3258)
 The National Crime Squad Service Authority (Levying) (Amendment) Order 1998 (S.I. 1998 No. 3259)
 The Education (School Performance Information)(England) (Amendment) Regulations 1998 (S.I. 1998 No. 3260)
 The City and County of Swansea(Electoral Arrangements) (No. 2) Order 1998 (S.I. 1998 No. 3261)
 The Prevention of Accidents to Children in Agriculture Regulations 1998 (S.I. 1998 No. 3262)
 The Crime and Disorder Act 1998 (Commencement No. 3 and Appointed Day) Order 1998 (S.I. 1998 No. 3263 (C. 82)])
 The Combined Probation Areas (North Wales) Order 1998 (S.I. 1998 No. 3264)
 The Combined Probation Areas (Powys) Order 1998 (S.I. 1998 No. 3265)
 The Inner London Probation Area (Amendment)Order 1998 (S.I. 1998 No. 3266)
 The Combined Probation Areas (Suffolk) Order 1998 (S.I. 1998 No. 3267)
 The Tyne and Wear Passenger Transport (Sunderland) Order 1998 (S.I. 1998 No. 3269)
 The Local Government Finance (New Parishes) (Amendment) Regulations 1998 (S.I. 1998 No. 3270)
 The City and County of Cardiff (Electoral Arrangements) Order 1998 (S.I. 1998 No. 3271)
 The Environment Act 1995 (Commencement No.13) (Scotland) Order 1998 (S.I. 1998 No. 3272 (C. 83) (S. 213)])
 The Port of Tyne Harbour Revision Order 1998 (S.I. 1998 No. 3277)

3301-3400

 The Local Government Act 1988 (Defined Activities) (Exemption) (Enfield London Borough Council) Order 1999 (S.I. 1998 No. 3302)
 The North West Wales National Health Service Trust (Establishment) Order 1998 (S.I. 1998 No. 3314)
 The Swansea (1999) National Health Service Trust (Establishment) Order 1998 (S.I. 1998 No. 3315)
 The Carmarthenshire National Health Service Trust (Establishment) Order 1998 (S.I. 1998 No. 3316)
 The Conwy and Denbighshire National Health Service Trust (Establishment) Order 1998 (S.I. 1998 No. 3317)
 The Pontypridd and Rhondda National Health Service Trust (Establishment) Order 1998 (S.I. 1998 No. 3318)
 The Bro Morgannwg National Health Service Trust (Establishment) Order 1998 (S.I. 1998 No. 3319)
 The North East Wales National Health Service Trust (Establishment) Order 1998 (S.I. 1998 No. 3320)
 The Gwent Healthcare National Health Service Trust (Establishment) Order 1998 (S.I. 1998 No. 3321)

External links
Legislation.gov.uk delivered by the UK National Archive
UK SI's on legislation.gov.uk
UK Draft SI's on legislation.gov.uk

See also
List of Statutory Instruments of the United Kingdom

Lists of Statutory Instruments of the United Kingdom
Statutory Instruments